This is a list of film directorial debuts in chronological order. The films and dates referred to are a director's first commercial cinematic release. Many film makers have directed works which were not commercially released, for example early works by Orson Welles such as his filming of his stage production of Twelfth Night in 1933 or his experimental short film The Hearts of Age in 1934. Often these early works were not intended for commercial release either by intent, such as film school projects or inability to find distribution.

Consequently, as television gained popularity in the 1940s and 1950s, many directors began to learn their craft in this medium. Notable directors who did their first directorial work in this medium include Robert Altman, Norman Jewison, Sidney Lumet, and Alfonso Cuarón. As commercial television advertising became more cinematic in the 1960s and 1970s, many directors' early work was in this medium, including directors such as Alan Parker and Ridley Scott. With the success of MTV and the popularity of music videos from the early 1980s, this gave another avenue for directors to hone their skills. Notable directors whose early work was in music videos include David Fincher, Jonathan Glazer, Michel Gondry, and Spike Jonze.

The following symbols indicate where a director has worked in another medium prior to directing commercially.

♦ Indicates where a director has created other earlier works for television

# Indicates when a director's earlier work is uncredited

† Indicates when a director's earlier work has not been released in cinemas, for example film school productions, short films or music videos.

Refer to individual entries for further detail.

1880s

1887
 Louis Le Prince – Man Walking Around a Corner

1890s

1896
 Alice Guy-Blaché – La Fée aux Choux
 Georges Méliès – Le Manoir du diable

1898
 Edwin S. Porter – The Cavalier's Dream

1900s

1901
 Segundo de Chomón – Bajada de Montserrat

1907
 Sidney Olcott – The Wooing of Miles Standish

1908
 Louis Feuillade – L'Homme aimanté
 D. W. Griffith –The Adventures of Dollie

1909
 Mack Sennett – The Curtain Pole

1910s

1911
 Oscar Apfel – The Wedding Bell
 Thomas H. Ince – Artful Kate

1912
 Herbert Brenon – All for Her
 Christy Cabanne – Life of Villa
 Michael Curtiz – Utolsó bohém, Az
 Francis Ford – The Post Telegrapher
 J. Farrell MacDonald – The Worth of a Man
 Wallace Reid – The Tribal Law
 Victor Sjöström – Ett hemligt giftermål
 Maurice Tourneur – Jean la Poudre 
 Robert Wiene – Die Waffen der Jugend

1913
 Wallace Beery – Kitty's Knight
 Frank Borzage – The Mystery of Yellow Aster Mine
 Hobart Bosworth – The Sea Wolf
 Jack Conway† – The Old Armchair
 Carmine Gallone – Il bacio di Cirano
 King Vidor – Hurricane in Galveston
 Raoul Walsh – The Pseudo Prodigal
 Dadasaheb Phalke - Raja Harishchandra

1914
 Charlie Chaplin – Twenty Minutes of Love
 Donald Crisp – Her Father's Silent Partner 
 Cecil B. DeMille – The Squaw Man
 Allan Dwan – The Unwelcome Mrs. Hatch
 William S. Hart – The Gringo
 Rex Ingram – The Symphony of Souls
 George Irving – The Jungle
 Alexander Korda – Orhaz a Karpatokban
 Robert Z. Leonard – The Master Key
 Frank Lloyd – The Law of His Kind
 John M. Stahl – A Boy and the Law
 William Desmond Taylor – The Smouldering Spark

1915
 Roscoe Arbuckle – Mabel and Fatty Viewing the World's Fair at San Francisco
 Richard Boleslavsky – Ty yeshcho ne umesh lyubit
 Charles Brabin – Vanity Fair
 Tod Browning – The Lucky Transfer
 Lon Chaney – The Stool Pigeon
 Harry Davenport – The Island of Regeneration
 Alan Hale – The Passing Storm 
 Frank Reicher – The Clue 
 Hal Roach – Willie Runs the Park
 William A. Seiter – The Honeymoon Roll

1916
 Francis X. Bushman – In the Diplomatic Service
 Alfred E. Green – The Temptation of Adam
 Oliver Hardy – Bungles Lands a Job 
 Rex Ingram – The Great Problem
 Rupert Julian – Naked Hearts
 Ernst Lubitsch – Shoe Palace Pinkus
 George Marshall – Love's Lariat
 Fred Niblo – Get-Rich-Quick Wallingford

1917
 John Ford – The Tornado
 Lambert Hillyer – An Even Break
 Harold Lloyd – Over the Fence
 Roy William Neill – The Girl, Glory
 John S. Robertson – Baby Mine
 Wesley Ruggles† – For France
 W. S. Van Dyke – The Land of Long Shadows

1918
 James Cruze – Too Many Millions
 Douglas Fairbanks – Arizona
 Dave Fleischer – Out of the Inkwell
 Howard C. Hickman† – The White Lie
 Zoltan Korda – Károly bakák
 Wallace Worsley – An Alien Enemy

1919
 Carl Theodor Dreyer – The President
 Victor Fleming – When the Clouds Roll By
 Max Fleischer – The Tantalizing Fly
 Fritz Lang – Halbblut
 Oscar Micheaux – The Homesteader
 F. W. Murnau – The Boy in Blue
 Gustav von Seyffertitz – The Secret Garden
 Erich von Stroheim – Blind Husbands

1920s

1920
 Clarence Brown – The Great Redeemer
 Erle C. Kenton – Down on the Farm
 Reinhold Schünzel – Der Graf von Cagliostro 
 Edward Sedgwick – Fantomas
 William A. Wellman† – The Twins of Suffering Creek 
 Sam Wood – Double Speed

1921
 William Dieterle – Der Mensch am Wege
 Gregory La Cava† – His Nibs
 John Gilbert – Love's Penalty
 Harry Houdini – The Soul of Bronze 
 William K. Howard – Get Your Man 
 Grover Jones – The Unknown 
 Rowland V. Lee – Blind Hearts
 Edward Ludwig – Rip Van Winkle
 Leo McCarey – Society Secrets
 Albert S. Rogell – The Ranch Mystery

1922
 Frank Capra – Fultah Fisher's Boarding House
 Irving Cummings – The Man from Hell's River
 Robert J. Flaherty – Nanook of the North
 Alexander Hall – A Game of Craft
 Rupert Hughes – The Wall Flower
 Frank Tuttle – The Cradle Buster

1923
 Adrian Brunel – The Man Without Desire
 William Dieterle – Der Mensch am Wege
 Sergei Eisenstein – Glumov's Diary
 Sessue Hayakawa – La Bataille 
 Seymour Hicks† – Always Tell Your Wife
 Julio Irigoyen – De Nuestras Pampas
 Buster Keaton – Three Ages
 Kenji Mizoguchi – Ai ni yomigaru hi
 Dudley Murphy† – High Speed Lee
 Berthold Viertel – Nana

1924
 Tay Garnett – Fast Break
 Grigori Kozintsev and Leonid Trauberg – The Adventures of Oktyabrina
 Jean Renoir – Backbiters

1925
 Clyde Bruckman – Cowboys Cry for It
 Jean Cocteau – Jean Cocteau fait du Cinema
 Roy Del Ruth† – Eve's Lover
 Sergei Eisenstein† – Strike
 Edmund Goulding – Sun-Up
 Alfred Hitchcock – The Pleasure Garden
 Walter Lang – The Red Kimono
 Stan Laurel – Chasing the Chaser
 Lewis Milestone† – Seven Sinners
 Paul Sloane – Too Many Kisses
 Josef von Sternberg – The Salvation Hunters
 A. Edward Sutherland – Coming Through
 Herbert Wilcox – Chu-Chin-Chow

1926
 Howard Hawks – The Road to Glory
 Miles Mander – The Whistler  
 Archie Mayo† – Money Talks
 Ray Taylor – Fighting with Buffalo Bill
 Edgar G. Ulmer# – The Border Sheriff
 William Wyler† – Lazy Lightning

1927
 Anthony Asquith – Shooting Stars
 Lloyd Bacon – The Heart of Maryland
 David Butler – High School Hero
 Robert Florey – One Hour of Love
 Mervyn LeRoy – No Place to Go
 Yasujirō Ozu – Zange no Yaiba

1928
 Norman Z. McLeod – Taking a Chance
 Norman Taurog† – Lucky Boy
 Alfred L. Werker – The Pioneer Scout
 Tim Whelan – Adam's Apple

1929
 Lionel Barrymore –  Madame X
 John Cromwell – Close Harmony
 Martin Frič – Father Vojtech
 Ivar Johansson – The Realm of the Rye
 Rouben Mamoulian – Applause
 Robert Milton – The Dummy
 Elliott Nugent# – Wise Girls
 Edgar Selwyn – The Girl in the Show
 Alf Sjöberg – Den starkaste

1930s

1930
 Luis Buñuel† – L'Age d'Or
 Lloyd Corrigan – Follow Thru
 George Cukor – Grumpy
 Howard Hughes – Hell's Angels
 Sidney Lanfield – Cheer Up and Smile
 Ray McCarey – Two Plus Fours
 Lowell Sherman† – Lawful Larceny
 Robert Siodmak – People on Sunday
 Jean Vigo – À propos de Nice
 James Whale – Journey's End

1931
 William Dieterle – The Last Flight
 Peter Godfrey – Down River
 Michael Powell – Two Crowded Hours
 Otto Preminger – The Great Love
 Jacques Tourneur† – 
 Stuart Walker – The Secret Call

1932
 Thorold Dickinson – The First Mrs. Fraser
 Karl Freund – The Mummy
 Henry Hathaway – Heritage of the Desert
 William Keighley – The Match King
 Henry Koster – Thea Roland
 Edwin L. Marin – The Death Kiss
 Irving Pichel – The Most Dangerous Game
 John Rawlins – High Society
 Herbert Selpin – Chauffeur Antoinette
 Robert Stevenson – Happy Ever After

1933
 Busby Berkeley – She Had to Say Yes
 Fei Mu – Night in the City
 Mitchell Leisen – Cradle Song
 Marcel Pagnol† – Le gendre de Monsieur Poirier
 George Stevens† – A Divorce Courtship
 Charles Vidor – Sensation Hunters
 Bernard Vorhaus – The Ghost Camera

1934
 Charles Barton – Wagon Wheels
 Cedric Gibbons – Tarzan and His Mate
 Brian Desmond Hurst – The Tell-Tale Heart
 John Farrow – The Spectacle Maker
 Arthur Lubin – A Successful Failure
 Mario Mattoli – Tempo Massimo
 Alice O'Fredericks – Ud i den kolde sne
 Billy Wilder – Mauvaise Graine
 Harold Young – Leave It to Blanche

1935
 W. C. Fields# – Man on the Flying Trapeze
 Edward Dmytryk – The Hawk
 James W. Horne – Bonnie Scotland
 Mehboob Khan – Judgement of Allah
 Yuan Muzhi – Scenes of City Life
 Carol Reed – It Happened in Paris
 Douglas Sirk† – The Girl from the Marsh Croft
 Jacques Tati – Gai dimanche

1936
 Lew Ayres – Hearts in Bondage
 John Brahm† – Broken Blossoms
 William Clemens – Man Hunt
 Norman Foster – I Cover Chinatown
 Stuart Heisler – Straight from the Shoulder
 Buck Jones – For the Service
 Gregory Ratoff – Sins of Man
 Wells Root – The Bold Caballero

1937
 Vijay Bhatt – Khwab Ki Duniya
 Giacomo Gentilomo – Sinfonia di Roma
 Roy Kellino – Concerning Mr. Martin
 Harold D. Schuster – Wings of the Morning
 S. Sylvan Simon – A Girl with Ideas
 Julio Saraceni – Noches de carnaval
 William Witney – The Painted Stallion

1938
 Leslie Howard – Pygmalion
 Erich Pommer – Vessel of Wrath
 George Waggner – Western Trails
 Mario Zampi – 13 Men and a Gun

1939
 Ricardo Cortez – Inside Story
 Harold Huth – Hell's Cargo
 Joseph Losey – Pete Roleum and his Cousins
 Leslie Norman – Too Dangerous to Live
 Vincent Sherman – The Return of Doctor X

1940s

1940
 Joseph Barbera and William Hanna# – Puss Gets the Boot
 William Morgan - Bowery Boy
 Vittorio De Sica – Rose scarlatte
 Preston Sturges – The Great McGinty

1941
 Jules Dassin – The Tell-Tale Heart
 John Huston – The Maltese Falcon
 Jean Negulesco – Singapore Woman
 Irving Rapper – Shining Victory
 Roberto Rossellini† – The White Ship
 George Sidney† – Free and Easy
 Ted Tetzlaff – World Premiere
 Orson Welles† – Citizen Kane
 Spencer Williams – The Blood of Jesus

1942
 Henri-Georges Clouzot – The Murderer Lives at Number 21
 Noël Coward and David Lean# – In Which We Serve
 Basil Dearden♦ and Will Hay – The Black Sheep of Whitehall
 Michael Gordon  – Boston Blackie Goes Hollywood
 Will Hay – The Black Sheep of Whitehall
 Charles Lederer – Fingers at the Window
 Albert Lewin – The Moon and Sixpence
 Anthony Mann♦ – Dr. Broadway
 Joseph M. Newman – Northwest Rangers
 Manoel de Oliveira† – Aniki-Bóbó
 Powell and Pressburger – One of Our Aircraft Is Missing

1943
 Robert Bresson – Angels of the Streets
 William Castle – Klondike Kate
 Delmer Daves – Destination Tokyo
 Maya Deren – Meshes of the Afternoon
 Jack Kinney – Saludos Amigos
 Akira Kurosawa – Sanshiro Sugata
 Frank Launder – Millions Like Us
 Vincente Minnelli# – Cabin in the Sky
 Dudley Nichols – Government Girl
 Luchino Visconti – Ossessione
 Fred M. Wilcox – Lassie Come Home

1944
 René Clément† – Paris sous la botte
 Charles Crichton – For Those in Peril
 Lewis Gilbert – Sailors Do Care
 James V. Kern – The Doughgirls
 Laurence Olivier – Henry V
 Helmut Weiss† – The Punch Bowl
 Robert Wise – The Curse of the Cat People

1945
 K. Asif – Phool
 Mel Ferrer – The Girl of the Limberlost
 Elia Kazan† – A Tree Grows in Brooklyn
 George Seaton – Diamond Horseshoe
 Don Siegel – Star in the Night
 William C. Thomas – Midnight Manhunt
 Hal Walker – Out of This World

1946
 Khwaja Ahmad Abbas – Dharti Ke Lal
 Chetan Anand – Neecha Nagar
 Ingmar Bergman – Crisis
 John Berry – Miss Susie Slagle's
 Richard Fleischer† – Child of Divorce
 Robert Hamer# – Pink String and Sealing Wax
 Joseph L. Mankiewicz – Dragonwyck
 William D. Russell† – Our Hearts Were Growing Up
 John Sturges – The Man Who Dared
 Peter Ustinov – School for Secrets
 Charles Walters – Ziegfeld Follies
 Terence Young – Theirs Is the Glory

1947
 Robert Alton – Merton of the Movies
 Ken Annakin† – Holiday Camp
 Roy Ward Baker – The October Man
 Martin Gabel – The Lost Moment
 Kon Ichikawa – A Thousand and One Nights with Toho
 Robert Montgomery – Lady in the Lake
 Rudolph Maté and Don Hartman –  It Had to Be You
 Robert Rossen – Johnny O'Clock
 Derek N. Twist – The End of the River

1948
 László Benedek# – The Kissing Bandit
 Terence Fisher – A Song for Tomorrow
 Jack Gage – The Velvet Touch
 Raj Kapoor – Aag
 Richard Quine – Leather Gloves
 Nicholas Ray – They Live by Night
 Bretaigne Windust – Winter Meeting

1949
 Stanley Donen and Gene Kelly – On the Town
 Sam Fuller – I Shot Jesse James
 John Guillermin – High Jinks in Society
 Ida Lupino – Never Fear
 Alexander Mackendrick – Whisky Galore!
 Jean-Pierre Melville† – Le Silence de la Mer
 Arne Skouen – Gategutter
 Emlyn Williams – The Last Days of Dolwyn

1950s

1950
 Michelangelo Antonioni† – Cronaca di un amore
 Richard Brooks – Crisis
 Youssef Chahine – Baba Amin
 Adolfo Celi – Caiçara
 Federico Fellini – Variety Lights
 Burgess Meredith – The Man on the Eiffel Tower
 Joseph Pevney – Shakedown
 J. Lee Thompson – Murder Without Crime
 Atif Yilmaz – Kanli Feryat

1951
 Guru Dutt – Baazi
 Harold F. Kress† – The Painted Hills
 Peter Lorre – The Lost One
 Christian Nyby – The Thing from Another World
 Robert Parrish – Cry Danger
 Russell Rouse – The Well
 Kaneto Shindo – Story of a Beloved Wife
 Charles Marquis Warren – Little Big Horn

1952
 Ritwik Ghatak – Chinnamul
 Guy Hamilton – The Ringer
 Paul Henreid – For Men Only
 Harry Horner – Red Planet Mars
 Ken Hughes – Wide Boy
 Nathan H. Juran – The Black Castle
 Jerzy Kawalerowicz – Gromada
 Masaki Kobayashi – My Son's Youth
 Noel Langley – The Pickwick Papers
 Arnold Laven – Without Warning!
 Chris Marker – Olympia 52
 Frank Tashlin† – The First Time

1953
 Robert Aldrich♦ – Big Leaguer
 Jack Arnold – Girls in the Night
 Don Chaffey – Skid Kids
 Jesse Hibbs† – The All American
 Stanley Kubrick† – Fear and Desire
 Francis D. Lyon♦ – Crazylegs
 Dick Powell – Split Second
 Emeric Pressburger – Twice Upon a Time
 Ed Wood♦ – Glen or Glenda

1954
 Abner Biberman – The Golden Mistress
 James Wong Howe† – Go, Man, Go!
 Nunnally Johnson – Night People
 Edmond O'Brien and Howard W. Koch – Shield for Murder
 Dennis O'Keefe – The Diamond
 Sergei Parajanov† – Andriesh
 Yves Robert – Les hommes ne pensent qu'à ça
 Tapan Sinha – Ankush
 Agnès Varda – La Pointe Courte

1955
 Hall Bartlett – Unchained
 Earl Bellamy♦ – Seminole Uprising
 Roger Corman – Swamp Women
 Hubert Cornfield† – Sudden Danger
 Blake Edwards – Bring Your Smile Along
 José Ferrer – The Cockleshell Heroes
 Bert I. Gordon  – King Dinosaur
 Stanley Kramer – Not as a Stranger
 Charles Laughton – The Night of the Hunter
 Burt Lancaster – The Kentuckian
 Delbert Mann – Marty
 Ray Milland – A Man Alone
 Satyajit Ray – Pather Panchali
 Mrinal Sen – Raat Bhore
 Don Sharp – The Stolen Airliner
 Melville Shavelson – The Seven Little Foys
 Andrzej Wajda† – A Generation
 Cornel Wilde – Storm Fear

1956
 Joseph Anthony – The Rainmaker
 Valentine Davies – The Benny Goodman Story
 Leonid Gaidai – A Weary Road
 Charles F. Haas♦ – Star in the Dust
 Andrew V. McLaglen – Man in the Vault
 Claude Sautet – Bonjour Sourire!
 Alex Segal♦ – Ransom!
 Seijun Suzuki – Minato no kanpai: Shôri o waga te ni
 Daniel Taradash – Storm Center
 Samuel A. Taylor – The Monte Carlo Story

1957
 Robert Altman†♦ – The Delinquents
 James B. Clark♦ – Under Fire
 Clive Donner – The Secret Place
 Anselmo Duarte – Absolutamente Certo
 Arthur Hiller♦ – The Careless Years
 Sidney Lumet♦ – 12 Angry Men
 Robert Mulligan♦ – Fear Strikes Out
 Art Napoleon – Man on the Prowl
 Martin Ritt – Edge of the City
 Franco Zeffirelli – Camping

1958
 Gabriel Axel♦ – The Girls Are Willing
 Jack Cardiff† – Intent to Kill
 Claude Chabrol – Le Beau Serge
 Robert Clarke – The Hideous Sun Demon
 Michel Deville – Une balle dans le canon
 Herschel Daugherty♦ – The Light in the Forest
 Henry Ephron – Sing Boy Sing
 Shōhei Imamura – Stolen Desire
 Wojciech Has† – Petla
 Irvin Kershner – Stakeout on Dope Street
 Louis Malle – Elevator to the Gallows
 José Mojica Marins – Adventurer's Fate
 George Pal – Tom Thumb
 Arthur Penn♦ – The Left Handed Gun
 Anthony Quinn – The Buccaneer
 Karel Reisz† – We Are the Lambeth Boys
 Bernhard Wicki – Warum Sind Sie Gegen Uns?

1959
 John Cassavetes – Shadows
 Jack Clayton† – Room at the Top
 Georges Franju† – Head Against the Wall
 Sidney J. Furie – A Dangerous Age
 Monte Hellman – Beast from Haunted Cave
 Ray Kellogg – The Killer Shrews
 Elen Klimov – Ostorzhno: poshlost
 Nagisa Oshima – A Town of Love and Hope
 Joel Rapp – High School Big Shot
 Alain Resnais – Hiroshima, Mon Amour
 Tony Richardson♦ – Look Back in Anger
 Éric Rohmer† – Le Signe du lion
 François Truffaut – The 400 Blows

1960s

1960
 Mario Bava – Black Sunday
 Herbert J. Leder – Pretty Boy Floyd
 Jerry Lewis – The Bellboy
 Walter Matthau – Gangster Story
 Jacques Rivette – Paris Belongs to Us
 Stuart Rosenberg♦ – Murder, Inc.
 Masahiro Shinoda – One-Way Ticket for Love
 Jean-Luc Godard† – À bout de souffle
 John Wayne – The Alamo
 Mel Welles – Code of Silence
 Michael Winner – Shoot to Kill
 Yoji Yamada – Zero no shôten
 Yoshishige Yoshida – Rokudenashi

1961
 Luis Alcoriza – Los jóvenes
 William Alland – Look in Any Window
 Marlon Brando – One-Eyed Jacks
 Jack Couffer - Nikki, Wild Dog of the North
 Jacques Demy† – Lola
 Richard Donner♦ – X-15
 Bryan Forbes – Whistle Down the Wind
 Kinji Fukasaku – Hakuchu no buraikan
 Greg Garrison♦ – Hey, Let's Twist!
 Susumu Hani† – Bad Boys
 Andrei Konchalovsky – The Boy and the Pigeon
 Buzz Kulik♦ – The Explosive Generation
 Claude Lelouch – Le propre de l'homme
 Sergio Leone# – The Colossus of Rhodes
 Pier Paolo Pasolini – Accattone
 Halit Refiğ† – Yasak Aşk
 Don Taylor – Everything's Ducky

1962
 Bernardo Bertolucci – La commare secca
 Alain Cavalier – Le combat dans l'île
 George Roy Hill – Period of Adjustment
 Norman Jewison♦ – 40 Pounds of Trouble
 Richard Lester†♦ – It's Trad, Dad!
 Abe Levitow - Gay Purr-ee
 Frank Perry – David and Lisa
 Roman Polanski† – Knife in the Water
 Gerald Potterton – My Financial Career
 John Schlesinger – A Kind of Loving
 Vilgot Sjöman – The Mistress
 Andrei Tarkovsky† – Ivan's Childhood
 Hiroshi Teshigahara – Pitfall

1963
 Lindsay Anderson – This Sporting Life
 Gower Champion♦ – My Six Loves
 Francis Ford Coppola†# – Dementia 13
 George Englund♦ – The Ugly American
 Forugh Farrokhzad – The House Is Black
 James Ivory – The Householder
 Jack O'Connell – Greenwich Village Story
 Ken Russell†♦ – French Dressing
 Franklin J. Schaffner♦ – The Stripper
 Peter Tewksbury♦ – Sunday in New York
 Peter Yates – Summer Holiday
 Bud Yorkin♦ – Come Blow Your Horn

1964
 Jack Curtis – The Flesh Eaters
 Miloš Forman† – Black Peter
 Samuel Goldwyn Jr. – The Young Lovers
 Philip Kaufman – Goldstein
 Elem Klimov – Welcome, or No Trespassing
 Larry Peerce – One Potato, Two Potato
 Glauber Rocha† – Black God, White Devil
 Ettore Scola† – Se permettete parliamo di donne
 Mel Stuart♦ – Four Days in November

1965
 Stephen C. Apostolof – Orgy of the Dead
 Bruno Bozzetto – West and Soda
 John Boorman♦ – Catch Us If You Can
 Steve Cochran – Tell Me in the Sunlight
 Fred Coe♦ – A Thousand Clowns
 John Derek – Nightmare in the Sun
 Costa-Gavras – The Sleeping Car Murders
 Ebrahim Golestan† – Brick and Mirror
 Daniel Haller – Die, Monster, Die!
 Dušan Makavejev† – Covek nije tica
 Ernest Pintoff† – Harvey Middleman, Fireman
 Sydney Pollack♦ – The Slender Thread
 Arthur Rankin Jr. – Willy McBean and His Magic Machine
 David Secter – Winter Kept Us Warm
 Elliot Silverstein – Cat Ballou
 Frank Sinatra – None but the Brave
 Jerzy Skolimowski♦ – Walkover
 Robert Sparr♦ – A Swingin' Summer
 K. Viswanath – Aatma Gowravam

1966
 Woody Allen – What's Up, Tiger Lily?
 Hy Averback♦ – Chamber of Horrors
 Jules Bass – The Daydreamer
 Paul Bogart♦ – The Three Sisters
 Ian Curteis♦ – The Projected Man
 Marguerite Duras – La musica
 Rainer Werner Fassbinder – Der Stadtstreicher
 Yasuharu Hasebe – Black Tight Killers
 William Klein – Who Are You, Polly Maggoo?
 Alexander Kluge – Yesterday Girl
 David Lane♦ – Thunderbirds Are Go
 Mariano Laurenti – Il vostro super agente Flit
 Darius Mehrjui – Diamond 33
 Mickey Moore – Paradise, Hawaiian Style
 Mike Nichols – Who's Afraid of Virginia Woolf?
 Lucian Pintilie – Sunday at Six
 Ousmane Sembene – Borom Sarret
 Volker Schlöndorff† – Der Junge Törless

1967
 Bob Clark† – She-Man
 Albert Finney – Charlie Bubbles
 William Friedkin♦ – Good Times
 Philippe Garrel† – Marie for Memory
 David Greene♦ – The Shuttered Room
 Anthony Harvey♦ – Dutchman
 Toshiya Fujita – Hikō shōnen: Hinode no sakebi
 Med Hondo – Soleil O
 Manoj Kumar – Upkar
 Ken Loach♦ – Poor Cow
 Howard Morris – Who's Minding the Mint?
 Carl Reiner – Enter Laughing
 Mark Rydell – The Fox
 Melvin Van Peebles† – The Story of a Three-Day Pass
 Michael Verhoeven – The Dance of Death

1968
 Kevin Billington♦ – Interlude
 Noel Black†♦ – Pretty Poison
 Peter Bogdanovich♦ – Voyage to the Planet of Prehistoric Women
 Mel Brooks – The Producers
 Jacques Charon – A Flea in Her Ear
 Brian De Palma† – Murder a la Mod
 Werner Herzog† – Signs of Life
 Alejandro Jodorowsky† – Fando y Lis
 Peter Medak – Negatives
 Paul Newman – Rachel, Rachel
 Melvin Van Peebles† – The Story of a Three-Day Pass
 George A. Romero† – Night of the Living Dead
 Raúl Ruiz† – Three Sad Tigers
 Martin Scorsese† – Who's That Knocking at My Door
 Fernando Solanas† – The Hour of the Furnaces
 Isao Takahata – Hols: Prince of the Sun
 Eric Till♦ – A Great Big Thing
 Bob Rafelson – Head

1969
 Roy Andersson† – Lördagen den 5.10
 Richard Attenborough – Oh! What a Lovely War
 Robert Alan Aurthur – The Lost Man
 John G. Avildsen† – Turn on to Love
 David Cronenberg† – Stereo
 Bob Fosse – Sweet Charity
 Piers Haggard♦ – I Can't... I Can't
 Tobe Hooper† – Eggshells
 Dennis Hopper – Easy Rider
 Peter R. Hunt – On Her Majesty's Secret Service
 Charles Jarrott♦ – Anne of the Thousand Days
 Paul Mazursky – Bob & Carol & Ted & Alice
 Bill Melendez† – A Boy Named Charlie Brown
 Anthony Newley – Can Heironymus Merkin Ever Forget Mercy Humppe and Find True Happiness?
 Alan J. Pakula – The Sterile Cuckoo
 Gordon Parks† – The Learning Tree
 Barney Platts-Mills† – Bronco Bullfrog
 Michael Ritchie – Downhill Racer
 Herbert Ross – Goodbye, Mr. Chips
 Paul Williams† – Out of It

1970s

1970
 Theodoros Angelopoulos – Reconstitution
 Dario Argento – The Bird with the Crystal Plumage
 Hal Ashby – The Landlord
 Rajinder Singh Bedi – Dastak
 James Bridges – The Baby Maker
 Gilbert Cates♦ – I Never Sang for My Father
 Ossie Davis – Cotton Comes to Harlem
 Richard A. Colla† – Zigzag
 Sean S. Cunningham – The Art of Marriage
 William A. Fraker – Monte Walsh
 Alan Gibson♦ – Crescendo
 Chuck Jones - The Phantom Tollbooth
 Lionel Jeffries – The Railway Children
 Leonard Kastle – The Honeymoon Killers
 Barbara Loden – Wanda
Burgess Meredith – The Yin and the Yang of Mr. Go
 Vic Morrow♦ – A Man Called Sledge
 Nicolas Roeg and Donald Cammell  – Performance
 Robert Scheerer♦ – Adam at 6 A.M.
 Arthur Allan Seidelman – Hercules in New York
 Wim Wenders – Summer in the City

1971
 Alan Arkin† – Little Murders
 George P. Cosmatos – Sin
 Clint Eastwood – Play Misty for Me
 John Erman♦ – Making It
 Peter Fonda – The Hired Hand
 James Frawley♦ – The Christian Licorice Store
 Stephen Frears – Gumshoe
 John D. Hancock – Let's Scare Jessica to Death
 Mike Hodges♦ – Get Carter
 Mike Leigh – Bleak Moments
 Jack Lemmon – Kotch
 George Lucas† – THX 1138
 Elaine May – A New Leaf
 Russ Mayberry♦ – The Jesus Trip
 Jack Nicholson – Drive, He Said
 Stewart Raffill – The Tender Warrior
 Ivan Reitman† – Foxy Lady
 Steven Hilliard Stern – B.S. I Love You
 Dalton Trumbo – Johnny Got His Gun
 Lawrence Turman – The Marriage of a Young Stockbroker
 Paul Verhoeven – Business Is Business
 Peter Weir†♦ – Homesdale
 Chatrichalerm Yugala – Out of the Darkness
 Claude Zidi – Les Bidasses en folie

1972
 Chantal Akerman† – Hôtel Monterey
 Michael Apted♦ – The Triple Echo
 Ralph Bakshi†♦ – Fritz the Cat
 Paul Bartel† – Private Parts
 Bruce Beresford – The Adventures of Barry McKenzie
 Robert Benton – Bad Company
 Robert Bolt – Lady Caroline Lamb
 Larry Cohen – Bone
 Jackie Cooper♦ – Stand Up and Be Counted
 Wes Craven – The Last House on the Left
 Bill Douglas† – My Childhood
 Daryl Duke♦ – Payday
 Adoor Gopalakrishnan – Swayamvaram
 Larry Hagman♦ – Beware! The Blob
 David Hemmings – Running Scared
 Perry Henzel – The Harder They Come
 Charlton Heston – Antony and Cleopatra
 Bruce Lee – The Way of the Dragon
 Djibril Diop Mambéty – Touki Bouki
 Gary Nelson♦ – Molly and Lawless John
 Gordon Parks Jr. – Super Fly
 Arnold Perl – Malcolm X
 Lee Philips – Getting Away from It All
 Sidney Poitier – Buck and the Preacher
 Michael Schultz♦ – Together for Days
 George C. Scott – Rage
 Kumar Shahani – Maya Darpan
 John Waters† – Pink Flamingos
 Clyde Ware – No Drums, No Bugles

1973
 Hector Babenco – O Fabuloso Fittipaldi
 Shyam Benegal♦ – Ankur
 Ricou Browning♦ – Salty
 Martin Campbell – The Sex Thief
 Joe D'Amato# – Death Smiles on a Murderer
 Philip D'Antoni – The Seven-Ups
 William Dear† – Nymph
 Kirk Douglas – Scalawag
 Charles K. Eastman – The All-American Boy
 Haile Gerima† – Child of Resistance
 Curtis Hanson – Sweet Kill
 Robin Hardy –The Wicker Man
 Anna Karina – Vivre ensemble
 Abbas Kiarostami† – The Experience
 John Landis – Schlock
 Mark L. Lester† – Steel Arena
 Terrence Malick† – Badlands
 John Milius† – Dillinger
 Sohrab Shahid-Saless♦ – A Simple Event
 Jeannot Szwarc♦ – Extreme Close-Up
 John Woo – Fist to Fist
 Howard Zieff – Slither

1974
 Paul Annett♦ – The Beast Must Die
 G. Aravindan – Uttarayanam
 Arizal♦ – Senyum dan Tangis
 John Byrum – Inserts
 Joe Camp – Benji
 John Carpenter† – Dark Star
 Michael Cimino – Thunderbolt and Lightfoot
 Jonathan Demme – Caged Heat
 Peter Hyams♦ – Busting
 Richard Loncraine♦† – Slade in Flame
 Jerry London♦ – Goodnight Jackie
 Nikita Mikhalkov† – At Home Among Strangers
 Ariane Mnouchkine – 1789
 Alan Ormsby – Deranged
 Wolfgang Petersen†♦ – One or the Other of Us
 Steven Spielberg†♦ – The Sugarland Express
 Oliver Stone† – Seizure
 Charles Swenson – Down and Dirty Duck
 Bertrand Tavernier – The Clockmaker
 Lewis Teague♦ – Dirty O'Neil
 Thierry Zéno† – Vase de Noces

1975
 Jean-Claude Brisseau – La croisee des chemins
 Patrice Chéreau – The Flesh of the Orchid
 Souleymane Cissé† – The Young Girl
 John Duigan – The Firm Man
 Terry Gilliam and Terry Jones – Monty Python and the Holy Grail
 Lasse Hallström♦† – A Guy and a Gal
 Scott Hicks† – Down the Wind
 Walter Hill – Hard Times
 Shirley MacLaine – The Other Half of the Sky: A China Memoir
 Nikos Nikolaidis† – Evrydiki BA 2O37
 Joan Micklin Silver† – Hester Street
 Helma Sanders-Brahms – Unter dem Pflaster ist der Strand
 Margarethe von Trotta♦† – The Lost Honour of Katharina Blum
 Gene Wilder – The Adventure of Sherlock Holmes' Smarter Brother
 Joseph Zito – Abduction

1976
 Allan Arkush† and Joe Dante† – Hollywood Boulevard
 Jean-Jacques Annaud – Black and White in Color
 John Badham♦ – The Bingo Long Traveling All-Stars & Motor Kings
 Catherine Breillat – A Real Young Girl
 Martha Coolidge† – Not a Pretty Picture
 Neal Israel – Tunnel Vision
 Derek Jarman – Sebastiane
 Krzysztof Kieślowski†♦ – Personnel
 Patrice Leconte† – Les vécés étaient fermés de l'interieur
 Jeff Lieberman† – Squirm
 Robert Moore♦ – Murder by Death
 Alan Parker†♦ – Bugsy Malone
 Michael Pressman – The Great Texas Dynamite Chase
 Burt Reynolds♦ – Gator
 Fred Schepisi† – The Devil's Playground
 George Schlatter♦ – Norman... Is That You?
 Kartal Tibet – Tosun Paşa

1977
 Joseph Brooks# – You Light Up My Life
 Valie Export – Unsichtbare Gegner
 Marty Feldman♦ – The Last Remake of Beau Geste
 Ron Howard† – Grand Theft Auto
 Girish Kasaravalli – Ghatashraddha
 Diane Kurys – Peppermint Soda
 David Lynch† – Eraserhead
 Phil Roman† – Race for Your Life, Charlie Brown
 Gregory Nava† – The Confessions of Amans
 Hal Needham – Smokey and the Bandit
 Chris Noonan – Bulls
 Phillip Noyce† – Backroads
 Nobuhiko Obayashi† – House
 Ridley Scott†♦ – The Duellists
 Béla Tarr† – Családi tűzfészek
 Fred Wolf - The Mouse and his Child

1978
 Muzaffar Ali – Gaman
 Bille August – In My Life
 Warren Beatty and Buck Henry – Heaven Can Wait
 Charles Burnett† – Killer of Sheep
 Buddhadeb Dasgupta† – Dooratwa
 Robert Klane – Thank God It's Friday
 Randal Kleiser♦ – Grease
 Richard Marquand – The Legacy
 Leiji Matsumoto♦ – Captain Harlock: Mystery of the Arcadia
 Anthony Minghella – A Little Like Drowning
 Errol Morris – Gates of Heaven
 Steve Rash – The Buddy Holly Story
 Fred Olen Ray# – The Brain Leeches
 Joan Rivers – Rabbit Test
 Paul Schrader – Blue Collar
 Alexander Sokurov† – The Lonely Voice of Man
 Sylvester Stallone – Paradise Alley
 James Toback – Fingers
 Jane Wagner – Moment by Moment
 Meir Zarchi – I Spit on Your Grave
 Robert Zemeckis† – I Wanna Hold Your Hand

1979
 Carroll Ballard – The Black Stallion
 Martin Brest† – Going in Style
 Albert Brooks♦ – Real Life
 Jackie Chan – The Fearless Hyena
 Alan Clarke – Scum
 Abel Ferrara† – The Driller Killer
 Goutam Ghose† – Maabhoomi
 Tsui Hark – The Butterfly Murders
 Agnieszka Holland†♦ – Provincial Actors
 Ann Hui♦ – The Secret
 Leon Ichaso – El Super
 George Miller – Mad Max
 Hayao Miyazaki♦ – The Castle of Cagliostro
 Russell Mulcahy – Derek and Clive Get the Horn
 George Peppard  – Five Days from Home
 Chris Petit – Radio On
 Julien Temple – The Great Rock 'n' Roll Swindle
 Joan Tewkesbury – Old Boyfriends
 Simon Wincer♦ – Snapshot

1980s

1980
 Jim Abrahams, David Zucker and Jerry Zucker – Airplane!
 Pedro Almodóvar† – Pepi, Luci, Bom
 Chuck Barris – The Gong Show Movie
 Walter Bernstein – Little Miss Marker
 Tony Bill – My Bodyguard
 William Peter Blatty – The Ninth Configuration
 James Caan – Hide in Plain Sight
 Rob Cohen – A Small Circle of Friends
 Bill Forsyth – That Sinking Feeling
 Peter Greenaway† – The Falls
 Robert Greenwald – Xanadu
 Taylor Hackford♦† – The Idolmaker
 Jim Jarmusch – Permanent Vacation
 Art Linson – Where the Buffalo Roam
 Adrian Lyne† – Foxes
 Mike Newell♦ – The Awakening
 Harold Ramis – Caddyshack
 Robert Redford – Ordinary People
 Jay Sandrich♦ – Seems Like Old Times
 John Sayles – Return of the Secaucus 7
 Roger Spottiswoode – Terror Train
 Fernando Trueba† – Opera Prima
 Nancy Walker♦ – Can't Stop the Music
 Gordon Willis – Windows

1981
 Alan Alda♦ – The Four Seasons
 Andrew Bergman – So Fine
 Kathryn Bigelow† and Monty Montgomery – The Loveless
 Peter Bonerz♦ – Nobody's Perfekt
 John Glen† – For Your Eyes Only
 Steve Gordon♦ – Arthur
 Jim Henson†♦ – The Great Muppet Caper
 Hugh Hudson† – Chariots of Fire
 Glenn Jordan♦ – Only When I Laugh
 Lawrence Kasdan – Body Heat
 Mika Kaurismäki – The Liar
 Uli Edel – Christiane F.
 Vadim Glowna – Desperado City
 Howard R. Cohen – Saturday the 14th
 Jean-Jacques Beineix – Diva
 Edward Bianchi – The Fan
 Nettie Peña – Home Sweet Home
 Juan Miñón and Miguel Ángel Trujillo – Kargus
 Jandhyala – Mudda Mandaram
 Graham Baker – Omen III: The Final Conflict
 Zoran Tadić – Rhythm of a Crime
 Michael Herz – Waitress!
 Emir Kusturica†♦ – Do You Remember Dolly Bell?
 Michael Mann†♦ – Thief
 Ron Mann† – Imagine the Sound
 Steve Miner – Friday the 13th Part 2
 Sam Raimi† – The Evil Dead
 Rick Rosenthal – Halloween II
 Oz Scott – Bustin' Loose
 Joel Schumacher♦ – The Incredible Shrinking Woman
 Penelope Spheeris† – The Decline of Western Civilization
 David Steinberg – Paternity

1982
 Jahnu Barua† – Aparoopa
 Richard Benjamin♦ – My Favorite Year
 Khairy Beshara♦ – Bloody Destinies
 Patricia Birch♦ – Grease 2
 Don Bluth† –The Secret of NIMH
 Patrick Bokanowski† – The Angel
 James Cameron† – Piranha II: The Spawning
 Nick Castle – Tag: The Assassination Game
 Roger Christian – The Sender
 Graeme Clifford†♦ – Frances
 Caleb Deschanel† – The Escape Artist
 Richard Elfman – Forbidden Zone
 Stuart Gillard – Paradise
 Amy Heckerling† – Fast Times at Ridgemont High
 Tim Hunter – Tex
 Amy Holden Jones – The Slumber Party Massacre
 Neil Jordan – Angel
 John Laing – Beyond Reasonable Doubt
 Barry Levinson♦ – Diner
 Aaron Lipstadt – Android
 Garry Marshall♦ – Young Doctors in Love
 Frank Oz – The Dark Crystal
 Albert Pyun – The Sword and the Sorcerer
 Susan Seidelman† – Smithereens
 Robert Towne – Personal Best
 David S. Ward – Cannery Row
 Edward Yang – Guang yin de gu shi
 Ronny Yu – The Postman Strikes Back
 Corey Yuen – Ninja in the Dragon's Den

1983
 Joe Alves – Jaws 3-D
 Roberto Benigni – Tu mi turbi
 Luc Besson† – Le Dernier Combat
 Paul Brickman – Risky Business
 James L. Brooks – Terms of Endearment
 Claudio Caligari – Toxic Love
 Michael Chapman – All the Right Moves
 Robert Dalva – The Black Stallion Returns
 Mel Damski – Yellowbeard
 Pál Erdöss – The Princess
 Sam Firstenberg – One More Chance
 John Herzfeld – Two of a Kind
 Robert Hiltzik – Sleepaway Camp
 Robert Jiras – I Am the Cheese
 Shekhar Kapur – Masoom
 Aki Kaurismäki – Crime and Punishment
 David Kendall – Luggage of the Gods!
 Jackie Kong – The Being
 Kiyoshi Kurosawa – Kandagawa Pervert Wars
 Mohsen Makhmalbaf – Tobeh Nosuh
 Robert Mandel – Independence Day
 Rick Moranis and Dave Thomas – Strange Brew
 Mamoru Oshii♦ – Urusei Yatsura: Only You
 Euzhan Palcy – Sugar Cane Alley
 Michael Radford† – Another Time, Another Place
 Mani Ratnam – Pallavi Anu Pallavi
 Sandip Ray – Phatik Chand
 Mark Rosman – The House on Sorority Row
 Tony Scott† – The Hunger
 James Signorelli – Easy Money
 Ching Siu-tung – Duel to the Death
 Barbra Streisand – Yentl
 David Worth – Warrior of the Lost World
 Yevgeny Yevtushenko – Kindergarten

1984
 Alejandro Agresti† – La Neutrónica explotó en Burzaco
 Steve Barron† – Electric Dreams
 John Carl Buechler† – The Dungeonmaster
 Ethan Coen and Joel Coen – Blood Simple
 Alex Cox† – Repo Man
 Léos Carax – Boy Meets Girl
 Gérard Depardieu – Le tartuffe
 Roland Emmerich† – The Noah's Ark Principle
 Atom Egoyan† – Next of Kin
 James Foley – Reckless
 Herb Gardner – The Goodbye People
 John Hughes – Sixteen Candles
 Juzo Itami – The Funeral
 Roland Joffé♦ – The Killing Fields
 Charles Shyer – Irreconcilable Differences
 Chen Kaige – Yellow Earth
 Gene Taft – Blame It on the Night
 Yoshiaki Kawajiri – Lensman
 Fritz Kiersch – Children of the Corn
 Ken Kwapis♦ – The Beniker Gang
 Albert Magnoli† – Purple Rain
 Marek Kanievska - Another Country
 Luis Mandoki† – Motel
 Leonard Nimoy♦ – Star Trek III: The Search for Spock
 Rob Reiner♦ – This Is Spinal Tap
 W. D. Richter – The Adventures of Buckaroo Banzai Across the 8th Dimension
 Valeria Sarmiento – Notfdhhfdre mariage
 Ruud van Hemert – Army Brats
 Brian Gilbert – The Frog Prince
 Roger Young – Lassiter
 Lars von Trier† – The Element of Crime
 Hugh Wilson†♦ – Police Academy

1985
 Dodo Abashidze – The Legend of Suram Fortress
 Dan Attias – Silver Bullet
 Hal Barwood† – Warning Sign
 George Bowers – Private Resort
 Tim Burton†♦ – Pee-wee's Big Adventure
 John R. Cherry III – Dr. Otto and the Riddle of the Gloom Beam
 Joyce Chopra† – Smooth Talk
 Rod Daniel♦ – Teen Wolf
 Stuart Gordon♦ – Re-Animator
 Lisa Gottlieb – Just One of the Guys
 Stephen Gyllenhaal – Certain Fury
 Savage Steve Holland – Better Off Dead
 Tom Holland – Fright Night
 Huang Jianxin – The Black Cannon Incident
 Amos Kollek – Goodbye, New York
 Stanley Kwan – Women
 Dwight H. Little – KGB: The Secret War
 Jonathan Lynn – Clue
 Alan Metter – Girls Just Want to Have Fun
 Walter Murch – Return to Oz
 Francesco Nuti – Casablanca, Casablanca
 David Nutter – Cease Fire
 James Orr – Breaking All the Rules
 Mark Romanek – Static
 Arna Selznick – The Care Bears Movie
 Alan Sharp – Little Treasure
 Howard Storm♦ – Once Bitten
 Fina Torres – Oriana
 Gus Van Sant†♦ – Mala Noche
 Will Vinton – The Adventures of Mark Twain
 Terry Zwigoff – Louie Bluie

1986
 David Anspaugh – Hoosiers
 Olivier Assayas† – Disorder
 David Byrne† – True Stories
 Howard Deutch† – Pretty in Pink
 Peter Faiman♦ – Crocodile Dundee
 Paul Michael Glaser♦ – Band of the Hand
 Vítor Gonçalves – A Girl In Summer
 Renny Harlin†♦ – Born American
 Stephen Herek – Critters
 Stephen King – Maximum Overdrive
 Spike Lee† – She's Gotta Have It
 Sondra Locke – Ratboy
 Jim Mallon – Blood Hook
 Penny Marshall♦ – Jumpin' Jack Flash
 John McNaughton† – Henry: Portrait of a Serial Killer
 John McTiernan – Nomads
 Michael Parks – The Return of Josey Wales
 Anthony Perkins – Psycho III
 Prince† – Under the Cherry Moon
 Bruce Robinson – Withnail and I
 Joe Roth – Streets of Gold
 Dale Schott – The Care Bears Movie II: A New Generation
 David Seltzer♦ – Lucas
 Charles Martin Smith – Trick or Treat
 Shion Sono† – Man's Flower Road
 Giuseppe Tornatore – Il camorrista
 Ziggy Steinberg – The Boss' Wife
 Agustí Villaronga† – Tras el cristal
 Edward Zwick♦† – About Last Night...

1987
 Allison Anders – Border Radio
 Emile Ardolino♦ – Dirty Dancing
 Jeff Bleckner♦ – White Water Summer
 Deborah Brock – Slumber Party Massacre II
 Chris Columbus – Adventures in Babysitting
 Bill Condon – Sister, Sister
 Danny DeVito†♦ – Throw Momma from the Train
 Nigel Dick† – P.I. Private Investigations
 Emilio Estevez – Wisdom
 Bob Giraldi† – Hiding Out
 Steve Gomer† – Sweet Lorraine
 Flora Gomes – Mortu Nega
 Michael Gornick†♦ – Creepshow 2
 Michael Gottlieb†♦ – Mannequin
 Tamar Simon Hoffs† – The Allnighter
 Stephen Hopkins†♦ – Dangerous Game
 Phil Joanou† – Three O'Clock High
 Diane Keaton† – Heaven
 Peter Jackson† – Bad Taste
 Mary Lambert† – Siesta
 Luis Llosa Urquidi – Hour of the Assassin
 David Mamet – House of Games
 Cheech Marin – Born in East L.A.
 Jerry Rees – The Brave Little Toaster
 Max Reid† – Wild Thing
 Phil Alden Robinson – In the Mood
 Jay Russell – The End of the Line
 John Stockwell – Under Cover
 Robert Townsend – Hollywood Shuffle
 Paul Weiland† – Leonard Part 6
 Charles Winkler – You Talkin' to Me?
 Zhang Yimou – Red Sorghum

1988
 Greg Beeman♦ – License to Drive
 Donald P. Bellisario♦ – Last Rites
 Glenn Gordon Caron – Clean and Sober
 Christopher Coppola – Dracula's Widow
 John Cornell – Crocodile Dundee II
 Gregory Dark† – Dead Man Walking
 Claire Denis – Chocolat
 Reha Erdem – Oh, Moon!
 Robert Englund – 976-EVIL
 Bran Ferren – Funny
 Mike Figgis♦ – Stormy Monday
 Andrew Fleming – Bad Dreams
 Mick Garris♦ – Critters 2: The Main Course
 Terence H. Winkless – The Nest
 George Scribner – Oliver & Company
 Keith Gordon – The Chocolate War
 Bob Hoskins – The Raggedy Rawney
 Annabel Jankel†♦ and Rocky Morton†♦ – D.O.A.
 Shaji N. Karun – Piravi
 Ben Lewin†♦ – Georgia
 John Lafia – The Blue Iguana
 Michael Lehmann† – Heathers
 Richard Linklater† – It's Impossible to Learn to Plow by Reading Books
 Guy Maddin† – Tales from the Gimli Hospital
 Ramón Menéndez – Stand and Deliver
 Chris Menges – A World Apart
 Mira Nair†♦ – Salaam Bombay!
 Yousry Nasrallah – Summer Thefts
 Donald Petrie♦ – Mystic Pizza
 Tina Rathborne♦ – Zelly and Me
 Bernard Rose – Paperhouse
 Gary Sinise – Miles from Home
 Kenneth Johnson – Short Circuit 2
 Jan Švankmajer† – Alice
 Skip Schoolnik – Hide and Go Shriek
 Ernest Thompson – 1969
 Michael Toshiyuki Uno†♦ – The Wash
 Aisling Walsh† – Joyriders
 Keenen Ivory Wayans – I'm Gonna Git You Sucka
 Henry Winkler♦ – Memories of Me
 Wong Kar-wai – Wong Gok Ka Moon

1989
 Meiert Avis† – Far from Home
 Bob Balaban♦ – Parents
 Sooraj R. Barjatya – Maine Pyar Kiya
 Kenneth Branagh – Henry V
 Jane Campion†♦ – Sweetie
 Michael Caton-Jones†♦ – Scandal
 Jeremiah S. Chechik – National Lampoon's Christmas Vacation
 Isabel Coixet† – Demasiado viejo para morir joven
 Pedro Costa – O Sangue
 Cameron Crowe – Say Anything...
 John Dahl – Kill Me Again
 Carl Franklin† – Nowhere to Run
 Paul Greengrass♦ – Resurrected
 Robert Sigl – Laurin
 Gary David Goldberg – Dad
 Wendell B. Harris Jr. – Chameleon Street
 Michael Haneke♦ – The Seventh Continent
 Rob Hedden – Friday the 13th Part VIII: Jason Takes Manhattan
 James Issac – The Horror Show
 Joe Johnston – Honey, I Shrunk the Kids
 Charles T. Kanganis – Deadly Breed
 Takeshi Kitano – Violent Cop
 Brett Leonard – The Dead Pit
 Chris Walas – The Fly II
 Sean McNamara – Hollywood Chaos
 Tahmineh Milani – Children of Divorce
 Michael Moore – Roger & Me
 Jonathan Mostow† – Beverly Hills Bodysnatchers
 John Murlowski – Return of the Family Man
 Eddie Murphy – Harlem Nights
 David Peoples† – The Blood of Heroes
 Alex Proyas† – Spirits of the Air, Gremlins of the Clouds
 Joe Pytka† – Let It Ride
 Eric Red† – Cohen and Tate
 Junji Sakamoto – Dotsuitarunen
 Victor Salva – Clownhouse
 Nancy Savoca – True Love
 Thomas Schlamme♦† – Miss Firecracker
 William Shatner – Star Trek V: The Final Frontier
 Jim Sheridan – My Left Foot
 Mel Smith – The Tall Guy
 Steven Soderbergh† – Sex, Lies, and Videotape
 Todd Solondz† – Fear, Anxiety & Depression
 Stephen Sommers† – Catch Me If You Can
 Ann Turner – Celia
 Joseph Vilsmaier – Autumn Milk
 Gary Winick – Curfew
 Joel Zwick♦ – Second Sight

1990s

1990
 Dyan Cannon† – The End of Innocence
 Kevin Costner – Dances with Wolves
 Manny Coto – Playroom
 Dennis Dugan♦ – Problem Child
 David Elfick – Harbour Beat
 Howard Franklin and Bill Murray – Quick Change
 John Harrison†♦ – Tales from the Darkside: The Movie
 Bob Hathcock♦† – DuckTales the Movie: Treasure of the Lost Lamp
 Reginald Hudlin† – House Party
 Caroline Link†♦ – Sommertage
 Sheldon Lettich – Lionheart
 James Keach – False Identity
 Nicole Garcia – Every Other Weekend
 Michael Fields – Bright Angel
 Benny Chan – A Moment of Romance
 V. Sekhar – Neengalum Herothan
 Sangeeth Sivan – Vyooham
 Richard Correll♦ – Ski Patrol
 Indra Kumar – Dil
 Rajkumar Santoshi – Ghayal
 Frank Marshall – Arachnophobia
 Joji Matsuoka† – Batāshi Kingyo
 Michele Placido – Pummarò
 Sally Mattison – Slumber Party Massacre III
 James D. Parriott – Heart Condition
 Jay Roach – Zoo Radio
 Tom Ropelewski – Madhouse
 Sergio Rubini – The Station
 Lone Scherfig♦ – Kaj's fødselsdag
 John Patrick Shanley – Joe Versus the Volcano
 Martin Sheen – Cadence
 Whit Stillman – Metropolitan
 Jon Turteltaub – Think Big
 Zdeněk Tyc – Vojtech, Called the Orphan
 Ron Underwood†♦ – Tremors
 Vasanth – Keladi Kannmanii
 Thomas Vinterberg – Sneblind
 Michael Winterbottom♦ – Forget About Me
 Zhang Yuan† – Mama

1991
 Jon Avnet♦ – Fried Green Tomatoes
 Dan Aykroyd – Nothing but Trouble
 Marco Bechis† – Alambrado
 Jack Bender♦ – Child's Play 3
 Susanne Bier† – Freud flyttar hemifrån...
 Simon Callow – The Ballad of the Sad Café
 Juan Jose Campanella – The Boy Who Cried Bitch
 Marc Caro♦† and Jean-Pierre Jeunet† – Delicatessen
 Carlos Carrera† – La mujer de Benjamín
 Topper Carew – Talkin' Dirty After Dark
 Peter Chelsom† – Hear My Song
 Rich Christiano – The Appointment
 Bud Cort – Ted & Venus
 Alfonso Cuarón†♦ – Sólo Con Tu Pareja
 Frank De Felitta♦ – Scissors
 Arnaud Desplechin – La Vie Des Morts
 Tom DiCillo – Johnny Suede
 Jaco Van Dormael♦ – Toto the Hero
 Bill Duke†♦ – A Rage in Harlem
 Jodie Foster – Little Man Tate
 George Gallo – 29th Street
 Bobcat Goldthwait – Shakes the Clown
 Bryan Gordon† – Career Opportunities
 Todd Haynes† – Poison
 Peter Hewitt† – Bill & Ted's Bogus Journey
 Kevin Hooks♦ – Strictly Business
 Jeffrey Hornaday♦† – Shout
 David Kellogg† – Cool as Ice
 Brian Levant♦ – Problem Child 2
 Doug McHenry and George Jackson – House Party 2
 Deepa Mehta♦ – Sam & Me
 Takashi Miike – Eyecatch Junction
 Phil Nibbelink and Simon Wells – An American Tail: Fievel Goes West
 Garin Nugroho – Cinta dalam Sepotong Roti
 Mario Van Peebles♦ – New Jack City
 Sean Penn – The Indian Runner
 Joseph Vásquez – The Bronx War
 David Price – Son of Darkness: To Die For II
 Matty Rich – Straight Out of Brooklyn
 Walter Salles – A Grande Arte
 John Singleton – Boyz n the Hood
 Barry Sonnenfeld – The Addams Family
 Rachel Talalay – Freddy's Dead: The Final Nightmare
 Prasanna Vithanage – Sisila Giniganee
 Irwin Winkler – Guilty by Suspicion

1992
 Rémy Belvaux†, André Bonzel† and Benoît Poelvoorde† – Man Bites Dog
 Mike Binder – Crossing the Bridge
 Uwe Boll – German Fried Movie
 Craig Bolotin† – That Night
 Park Chan-wook – The Moon Is... the Sun's Dream
 Billy Crystal – Mr. Saturday Night
 Tamra Davis† – Guncrazy
 Ernest Dickerson – Juice
 Bill Kroyer† – FernGully: The Last Rainforest
 Nora Ephron – This Is My Life
 David Fincher† – Alien 3
 Dale Launer - Love Potion No. 9
 Rituparno Ghosh – Hirer Angti
 Arne Glimcher – The Mambo Kings
 Beeban Kidron† – Used People
 Leslie Harris – Just Another Girl on the I.R.T.
 Brian Henson – The Muppet Christmas Carol
 Mark Herman† – Blame It on the Bellboy
 Ang Lee – Pushing Hands
 Baz Luhrmann – Strictly Ballroom
 Alison Maclean♦† – Crush
 Les Mayfield♦† – Encino Man
 Randall Miller♦† – Class Act
 Tsai Ming-liang♦ – Rebels of the Neon God
 Edward James Olmos♦ – American Me
 Kenny Ortega†♦ – Newsies
 Jafar Panahi† – The Friend
 Tim Robbins – Bob Roberts
 Robert Rodriguez† – El Mariachi
 Damon Santostefano† – Severed Ties
 M. Night Shyamalan – Praying with Anger
 Bruce W. Smith – Bébé's Kids
 Quentin Tarantino† – Reservoir Dogs
 Betty Thomas♦ – Only You
 John Turturro – Mac
 Anthony Drazan†♦ - Zebrahead

1993
 Daniel Alfredson†♦ – The Man on the Balcony
 Marco Brambilla – Demolition Man
 Thomas Carter♦ – Swing Kids
 Gurinder Chadha♦† – Bhaji on the Beach
 Rusty Cundieff – Fear of a Black Hat
 Robert De Niro – A Bronx Tale
 Guillermo del Toro† – Cronos
 Ted Demme♦† – Who's the Man?
 Duwayne Dunham – Homeward Bound: The Incredible Journey
 David Mickey Evans – The Sandlot
 Morgan Freeman – Bopha!
 E. Max Frye – Amos & Andrew
 Bruce Joel Rubin – My Life
 Mel Gibson – The Man Without a Face
 Richard Williams† – The Thief and the Cobbler
 Paul Haggis♦† – Red Hot
 Fraser Clarke Heston♦† – Needful Things
 Albert Hughes and Allen Hughes† – Menace II Society
 Nicholas Kazan♦ – Dream Lover
 John Madden♦ – Ethan Frome
 Radu Mihăileanu† – Trahir
 Gary O. Bennett – Rain Without Thunder
 Trey Parker† – Cannibal! The Musical
 Mikael Salomon – A Far Off Place
 Don Scardino♦ – Me and Veronica
 Henry Selick† – The Nightmare Before Christmas
 Dominic Sena† – Kalifornia
 Alan Shapiro♦ – The Crush
 Bryan Singer† – Public Access
 Daniel Stern♦ – Rookie of the Year
 Stephen Surjik†♦ – Wayne's World 2
 Tran Anh Hung† – The Scent of Green Papaya
 Tom Tykwer† – Deadly Maria
 John Whitesell♦ – Calendar Girl
 Alex Winter and Tom Stern – Freaked
 Wang Xiaoshuai – The Days
 Steven Zaillian – Searching for Bobby Fischer

1994
 Roger Allers and Rob Minkoff† – The Lion King
 Paul W. S. Anderson – Shopping
 Jacques Audiard – Regarde les hommes tomber
 Roger Avary – Killing Zoe
 Timur Bekmambetov♦ – Peshavar Waltz
 Adam Bernstein† – It's Pat
 Danny Boyle♦ – Shallow Grave
 Stephen Chow – King of Destruction
 Julie Cypher† – Teresa's Tattoo
 Frank Darabont♦ – The Shawshank Redemption
 Jan de Bont – Speed
 Peter Farrelly – Dumb and Dumber
 James Gray – Little Odessa
 Anthony Michael Hall – Hail Caesar
 P. J. Hogan† – Muriel's Wedding
 George Huang – Swimming with Sharks
 Nicholas Hytner – The Madness of King George
 Patrick Keiller† – London
 Doug Liman – Getting In
 Hart Bochner – PCU
 Darnell Martin† – I Like It Like That
 Takashi Miike† – Daisan no gokudō
 Jessie Nelson† – Corrina, Corrina
 John Pasquin♦ – The Santa Clause
 Jeff Pollack – Above the Rim
 Jonathan Prince♦ – Camp Nowhere
 Kelly Reichardt – River of Grass
 Adam Resnick – Cabin Boy
 David O. Russell† – Spanking the Monkey
 Steven Seagal – On Deadly Ground
 Peter Segal♦ – Naked Gun : The Final Insult
 Tom Shadyac♦ – Ace Ventura: Pet Detective
 Kevin Smith† – Clerks
 Ben Stiller♦† – Reality Bites
 Lee Tamahori†♦ – Once Were Warriors
 Caroline Thompson – Black Beauty
 Rupert Wainwright†♦ – Blank Check
 Sam Weisman♦ – D2: The Mighty Ducks

1995
 Tomas Alfredson♦ – Bert: The Last Virgin
 Debbie Allen♦ – Out-of-Sync
 Jason Alexander♦ – For Better or Worse
 Brad Anderson – Frankenstein's Planet of Monsters!
 Noah Baumbach – Kicking and Screaming
 Michael Bay† – Bad Boys
 Larry Bishop – Mad Dog Time
 Icíar Bollaín†♦ – Hola, ¿estás sola?
 Steven Brill – Heavyweights
 Stephen Chbosky – The Four Corners of Nowhere
 John Fortenberry♦ – Jury Duty
 Larry Clark – Kids
 Frank Coraci – Murdered Innocence
 Joel Cohen and Alec Sokolow – Monster Mash
 Rick Stevenson – Magic in the Water
 Gary Fleder♦ – Things to Do in Denver When You're Dead
 Lesli Linka Glatter†♦ – Now and Then
 F. Gary Gray† – Friday
 Charles Herman-Wurmfeld – Fanci's Persuasion
 Scott Kalvert† – The Basketball Diaries
 Hirokazu Koreeda♦ – Maborosi
 John Lasseter† – Toy Story
 Kevin Lima – A Goofy Movie
 Robert Longo† – Johnny Mnemonic
 James Mangold – Heavy
 Daisy von Scherler Mayer – Party Girl
 Melanie Mayron♦ – The Baby-Sitters Club
 Rebecca Miller – Angela
 Gavin O'Connor† – Comfortably Numb
 Steve Oedekerk† – Ace Ventura: When Nature Calls
 Oliver Parker – Othello
 Jean-François Richet – État des lieux
 Brian Robbins – The Show
 Joaquim Sapinho – Haircut
 Hans-Christian Schmid†♦ – Nach Fünf im Urwald
 Holly Goldberg Sloan – The Big Green
 Bryan Spicer♦ – Mighty Morphin Power Rangers: The Movie
 Brad Silberling†♦ – Casper
 Wesley Strick – The Tie That Binds
 Andy Tennant♦ – It Takes Two
 Forest Whitaker♦ – Waiting to Exhale
 Gregory Widen♦ – The Prophecy
 Edgar Wright† – A Fistful of Fingers
 Lou Ye – Weekend Lover
 Rusty Cundieff - Fear of a Black Hat

1996
 Alejandro Amenábar – Tesis
 Paul Thomas Anderson† – Hard Eight
 Wes Anderson† – Bottle Rocket
 Imanol Arias – Un asunto privado
 Kevin Bacon – Losing Chase
 Paris Barclay† – Don't Be a Menace to South Central While Drinking Your Juice in the Hood
 Steve Buscemi – Trees Lounge
 Stuart Baird – Executive Decision
 Jason Bloom† – Bio-Dome
 Matthew Bright – Freeway
 Matthew Broderick – Infinity
 Nick Cassavetes – Unhook the Stars
 Jay Chandrasekhar – Puddle Cruiser
 R. J. Cutler – A Perfect Candidate
 Seth Michael Donsky – Twisted
 Cheryl Dunye† – The Watermelon Woman
 David R. Ellis – Homeward Bound II: Lost in San Francisco
 Bobby Farrelly – Kingpin
 Jonathan Frakes♦ – Star Trek: First Contact
 Terry George – Some Mother's Son
 Michael Goldenberg – Bed of Roses
 Jose Zeka Laplaine† – Macadam Tribu
 Tom Hanks♦ – That Thing You Do!
 Mary Harron♦ – I Shot Andy Warhol
 Gregory Hoblit♦ – Primal Fear
 Nicole Holofcener† – Walking and Talking
 Anthony Hopkins – August
 Adam Coleman Howard – Dead Girl
 Bronwen Hughes† – Harriet the Spy
 Anjelica Huston – Bastard Out of Carolina
 Mike Judge†♦ – Beavis and Butt-Head Do America
 David Koepp† – The Trigger Effect
 Ki-duk Kim†♦ – Crocodile
 Martin Lawrence – A Thin Line Between Love and Hate
 Quentin Lee† – Flow
 Danny Leiner† – Layin' Low
 Kevin Macdonald♦ – Chaplin's Goliath
 Nelson McCormick♦ – For Which He Stands
 Douglas McGrath – Emma
 Shane Meadows† – Small Time
 Greg Mottola – The Daytrippers
 Niels Arden Oplev† – Portland
 Al Pacino – Looking for Richard
 Alexander Payne† – Citizen Ruth
 John Putch† – Alone in the Woods
 Krishna Rao – Crossworlds
 Matt Reeves† – The Pallbearer
 Sabu – Dangan Runner
 Arlene Sanford♦ – A Very Brady Sequel
 John Schultz – Bandwagon
 Campbell Scott and Stanley Tucci – Big Night
 Adrienne Shelly† – Sudden Manhattan
 Daryush Shokof – Seven Servants
 Kevin Spacey† – Albino Alligator
 Nicolas Winding Refn – Pusher
 Billy Bob Thornton – Sling Blade
 The Wachowskis – Bound

1997
 Miguel Arteta – Star Maps
 William Brent Bell – Sparkle and Charm
 Andy Cadiff♦ – Leave It to Beaver
 Peter Cattaneo – The Full Monty
 Dean Cundey – Honey, We Shrunk Ourselves
 Vondie Curtis-Hall – Gridlock'd
 Johnny Depp♦ – The Brave
 Mark Dindal – Cats Don't Dance
 Vin Diesel† – Strays
 Mark A.Z. Dippé – Spawn
 Bruno Dumont – La vie de Jésus
 Bart Freundlich† – The Myth of Fingerprints
 Vincent Gallo – Buffalo '66
 Raja Gosnell – Home Alone 3
 Peter Howitt – Sliding Doors
 Nick Hurran♦ – Remember Me?
 Timothy Hutton – Digging to China
 Bob Koherr – Plump Fiction
 Satoshi Kon – Perfect Blue
 Paul Miller♦ – The Pest
 Harmony Korine – Gummo
 Andrew Kötting† – Gallivant
 Neil LaBute – In the Company of Men
 Mimi Leder♦ – The Peacemaker
 Kasi Lemmons – Eve's Bayou
 John R. Leonetti – Mortal Kombat: Annihilation
 Shawn Levy† – Address Unknown
 Justin Lin – Shopping for Fangs
 David Mirkin♦ – Romy and Michele's High School Reunion
 Vincenzo Natali – Cube
 Andrew Niccol – Gattaca
 William Nicholson♦ – Firelight
 Cherie Nowlan† – Thank God He Met Lizzie
 Peter O'Fallon♦ – Suicide Kings
 Stephen Kessler – Vegas Vacation
 Gary Oldman – Nil by Mouth
 François Ozon† – Regarde la Mer
 Mark Pellington†♦ – Going All the Way
 Rafi Pitts† – The Fifth Season
 John Ridley – Cold Around the Heart
 Brett Ratner† – Money Talks
 Tom Schulman – 8 Heads in a Duffel Bag
 Nick Searcy – Carolina Low
 Jill Sprecher – Clockwatchers
 Darren Stein† – Sparkler
 Tim Story – One of Us Tripped
 Kiefer Sutherland♦ – Truth or Consequences, N.M.
 George Tillman Jr.† – Soul Food
 Gore Verbinski† – MouseHunt
 Mark Waters – The House of Yes
 Simon West – Con Air
 Scott Winant♦ – 'Til There Was You
 Alex Zamm†♦ – Chairman of the Board
 Jia Zhangke† – Xiao Wu

1998
 Fatih Akın†♦ – Short Sharp Shock
 Darren Aronofsky† – Pi
 Matt Earl Beesley – Point Blank
 Peter Berg♦ – Very Bad Things
 Tony Bancroft and Barry Cook† – Mulan
 Troy Beyer – Let's Talk About Sex
 Steve Boyum – Meet the Deedles
 Joe Carnahan – Blood, Guts, Bullets and Octane
 Niki Caro♦† – Memory & Desire
 Frederik Du Chau – Quest for Camelot
 Lisa Cholodenko† – High Art
 Nuri Bilge Ceylan – Kasaba
 Joan Chen – Xiu Xiu: The Sent Down Girl
 Derek Cianfrance – Brother Tied
 David Dobkin† – Clay Pigeons
 Harry Elfont and Deborah Kaplan – Can't Hardly Wait
 Antoine Fuqua† – The Replacement Killers
 Ice Cube† – The Players Club
 Wayne Isham† – 12 Bucks
 Karan Johar – Kuch Kuch Hota Hai
 Mark Steven Johnson – Simon Birch
 Tony Kaye†♦ – American History X
 Jake Kasdan† – Zero Effect
 Igor Kovalyov♦† and Norton Virgien♦ – The Rugrats Movie 
 Nagesh Kukunoor – Hyderabad Blues
 Larry David – Sour Grapes
 Paul McGuigan – The Acid House
 Samira Makhmalbaf – The Apple
 Sean Mathias – Bent
 Des McAnuff – Cousin Bette
 Don McKellar† – Last Night
 Olivier Megaton†♦ – Tout Morose
 Michael Martin† – I Got the Hook-Up
 Fernando Meirelles†♦ – O Menino Maluquinho 2
 Nancy Meyers – The Parent Trap
 Lukas Moodysson – Show Me Love
 Gaspar Noé† – Seul contre tous
 Christopher Nolan† – Following
 Dean Parisot†♦ – Home Fries
 Pat Proft – Wrongfully Accused
 Guy Ritchie† – Lock, Stock and Two Smoking Barrels
 Craig Ross Jr. – Cappuccino
 Gary Ross – Pleasantville
 Bob Saget†♦ – Dirty Work
 Millicent Shelton†♦ – Ride
 Tony Singletary♦ – High Freakquency
 Abderrahmane Sissako† – Life on Earth
 Kevin Rodney Sullivan♦ – How Stella Got Her Groove Back
 John Terlesky – The Pandora Project
 Toshiaki Toyoda – Pornostar
 Denis Villeneuve† – August 32nd on Earth
 Randall Wallace – The Man in the Iron Mask
 Hype Williams† – Belly
 David Yates†♦ – The Tichborne Claimant

1999
 Jamie Babbit†♦ – But I'm a Cheerleader
 Jaume Balagueró†♦ – The Nameless
 Antonio Banderas – Crazy in Alabama
 Brad Bird♦ – The Iron Giant
 John Bruno† – Virus
 Tony Bui† – Three Seasons
 Sofia Coppola† – The Virgin Suicides
 Troy Duffy – The Boondock Saints
 Jim Fall – Trick
 Hampton Fancher – The Minus Man
 Rick Famuyiwa† – The Wood
 Jeff Franklin♦ – Love Stinks
 Chris Buck – Tarzan
 Tony Goldwyn – A Walk on the Moon 
 Luca Guadagnino – The Protagonists
 Gary Halvorson♦ – The Adventures of Elmo in Grouchland
 Brian Helgeland – Payback
 Tim Hill†♦ – Muppets from Space
 Gavin Hood† – A Reasonable Man
 Hugh Johnson† – Chill Factor
 Spike Jonze† – Being John Malkovich
 Maurice Joyce - Doug's 1st Movie
 Gil Junger♦ – 10 Things I Hate About You
 Clare Kilner† – Janice Beard
 Roger Kumble – Cruel Intentions
 Paul Lazarus♦ – Seven Girlfriends
 Michael Patrick Jann – Drop Dead Gorgeous
 Malcolm D. Lee – The Best Man
 Rod Lurie† – Deterrence
 Theodore Melfi – Winding Roads
 Sam Mendes♦ – American Beauty
 Dave Meyers† – Foolish
 Mike Mitchell†♦ – Deuce Bigalow: Male Gigolo
 Daniel Myrick and Eduardo Sánchez – The Blair Witch Project
 Stanley Nelson Jr.† – The Black Press: Soldiers Without Swords
 Babak Payami – One More Day
 Kimberly Peirce† – Boys Don't Cry
 Lynne Ramsay – Ratcatcher
 Tim Roth – The War Zone
 Shi Runjiu – A Beautiful New World
 Sara Sugarman† – Mad Cows
 S. J. Surya – Vaali
 Julie Taymor♦ – Titus
 Pablo Trapero† – Crane World
 Manuela Viegas – Gloria
 Chris Weitz and Paul Weitz – American Pie

2000s

2000
 Asia Argento♦ – Scarlet Diva
 Britt Allcroft - Thomas and the Magic Railroad
 Andrzej Bartkowiak† – Romeo Must Die
 Greg Berlanti – The Broken Hearts Club: A Romantic Comedy
 Thomas Bezucha – Big Eden
 Bong Joon-ho – Barking Dogs Never Bite
 Craig Brewer – The Poor & Hungry
 Steve Carr† – Next Friday
 Stephen Daldry† – Billy Elliot
 Scott Derrickson† – Hellraiser: Inferno
 Tom Dey – Shanghai Noon
 DJ Pooh – 3 Strikes
 Andrew Dominik – Chopper
 Bill Eagles♦ – Beautiful Creatures
 Jun Falkenstein – The Tigger Movie
 Sally Field♦ – Beautiful
 Marc Forster† – Everything Put Together
 Jonathan Glazer† – Sexy Beast
 David Gordon Green – George Washington
 Jon Gunn – Mercy Streets
 Alejandro González Iñárritu†♦ – Amores perros
 Davis Guggenheim†♦ – Gossip
 Bonnie Hunt – Return to Me
 Jack Johnson – Thicker than Water
 Abdellatif Kechiche – La Faute à Voltaire
 Janusz Kamiński – Lost Souls
 Chris Koch♦ – Snow Day
 Karyn Kusama – Girlfight
 Baltasar Kormákur† – 101 Reykjavík
 Kenneth Lonergan – You Can Count on Me
 Peter Lord† and Nick Park† – Chicken Run
 Joe Mantegna – Lakeboat
 McG† – Charlie's Angels
 David McNally – Coyote Ugly
 Christopher McQuarrie – The Way of the Gun
 Nigel Cole – Saving Grace
 Marzieh Meshkini – The Day I Became a Woman
 Edward Norton – Keeping the Faith
 Todd Phillips† – Road Trip
 Shane O'Sullivan – Second Generation
 Gina Prince-Bythewood† – Love & Basketball
 Peyton Reed†♦ – Bring It On
 Tarsem Singh† – The Cell
 Courtney Solomon – Dungeons & Dragons
 Robert Vince – MVP: Most Valuable Primate
 Apichatpong Weerasethakul† – Mysterious Object at Noon
 Alexander Witt – Resident Evil: Apocalypse
 James Wong – Final Destination
 Kate Woods♦ – Looking for Alibrandi
 Ben Younger – Boiler Room

2001
 Andrew Adamson† and Vicky Jenson†♦ – Shrek
 Lisandro Alonso – La Libertad
 Adrian Caetano† – Bolivia
 Wang Chao – The Orphan of Anyang
 Michael Cuesta – L.I.E.
 Jeff Daniels – Escanaba in da Moonlight
 John A. Davis†♦ – Jimmy Neutron: Boy Genius
 Pete Docter† – Monsters, Inc.
 Jesse Dylan† – How High
 Jon Favreau♦ – Made
 Todd Field† – In the Bedroom
 Joel Gallen♦ – Not Another Teen Movie
 Lawrence Guterman† – Cats & Dogs
 Michel Gondry† – Human Nature
 Dennie Gordon†♦ – Joe Dirt
 Tom Green† – Freddy Got Fingered
 Luke Greenfield† – The Animal
 Oliver Hirschbiegel♦ – Das Experiment
 Jeeva – 12B
 Asif Kapadia† – The Warrior
 Semih Kaplanoğlu♦ – Herkes Kendi Evinde
 Richard Kelly† – Donnie Darko
 Yorgos Lanthimos†♦ – My Best Friend
 Jennifer Jason Leigh and Alan Cumming♦  – The Anniversary Party
 Gonzalo López-Gallego†♦ – Nómadas
 Gary Hardwick – The Brothers
 Christine Lahti† – My First Mister
 Nick Love – Goodbye Charlie Bright
 Robert Luketic† – Legally Blonde
 The Malloys† – Out Cold
 Francine McDougall† – Sugar & Spice
 Vanessa Middleton – 30 Years to Life
 John Cameron Mitchell – Hedwig and the Angry Inch
 John Moore† – Behind Enemy Lines
 Bill Paxton† – Frailty
 Pitof – Vidocq
 Juan Pablo Rebella and Pablo Stoll – 25 Watts
 J. B. Rogers – Say It Isn't So
 Daniel Sackheim♦ – The Glass House
 Adam Shankman† – The Wedding Planner
 Paolo Sorrentino – One Man Up
 Chris Stokes† – House Party 4: Down to the Last Minute
 Michael Tollin♦† – Summer Catch
 David Wain†♦ – Wet Hot American Summer
 Daniel Waters – Happy Campers

2002
 Jonas Åkerlund†♦ – Spun
 Walt Becker – Van Wilder
 Jeffrey Blitz – Spellbound
 Kevin Bray† – All About the Benjamins
 Andrew Bujalski – Funny Ha Ha
 Neil Burger – Interview with the Assassin
 Nicolas Cage – Sonny
 Mort Nathan – Boat Trip
 Juan Carlos Fresnadillo† – Intacto
 Stephen Fry – Bright Young Things
 Paul Goldman† – Australian Rules 
 Peter Care† – The Dangerous Lives of Altar Boys
 D. J. Caruso†♦ – The Salton Sea
 Chuan Lu – The Missing Gun
 George Clooney – Confessions of a Dangerous Mind
 Mark Brown – Two Can Play That Game
 James Cox† – Highway
 Damon Dash – Paper Soldiers
 Julie Delpy† – Looking for Jimmy
 Bob Dolman – The Banger Sisters
 Abbas Fahdel† – Back to Babylon
 Juan Carlos Fresnadillo† – Intacto
 Stephen Fry – Bright Young Things
 Paul Goldman† – Australian Rules 
 David S. Goyer – Zig Zag
 Christophe Honoré† – Seventeen Times Cecile Cassard
 Callie Khouri – Divine Secrets of the Ya-Ya Sisterhood
 Janez Lapajne – Rustling Landscapes
 Michael Lembeck♦ – The Santa Clause 2
 Louis Leterrier – The Transporter
 Julien Magnat† – Bloody Mallory
 Sophie Marceau – Speak to Me of Love
 Neil Marshall – Dog Soldiers
 Rob Marshall♦ – Chicago
 Craig McCracken†♦ – The Powerpuff Girls Movie
 Lucky McKee† – May
 David Mackenzie†♦ – The Last Great Wilderness
 Cristian Mungiu† – Occident
 Dewey Nicks – Slackers
 José Padilha – Bus 174
 Michael Petroni – Till Human Voices Wake Us
 Marcus Raboy† – Friday After Next
 Carlos Reygadas† – Japan
 Eli Roth – Cabin Fever
 Carlos Saldanha and Chris Wedge – Ice Age
 Chris Sanders and Dean DeBlois – Lilo & Stitch
 Robert Schwentke† – Tattoo
 Charles Stone III† – Drumline
 John Stainton♦ – The Crocodile Hunter: Collision Course
 Yen Tan – Happy Birthday
 Colin Trevorrow† – Reality Show
 Jesse Vaughan♦† – Juwanna Mann
 Denzel Washington – Antwone Fisher
 Lydia Zimmermann† and Isaac Pierre Racine† – Aro Tolbukhin. En la mente del asesino

2003
 Yasmin Ahmad – Rabun
 LeVar Burton♦ – Blizzard
 Reggie Rock Bythewood♦ – Biker Boyz
 Larry Charles – Masked and Anonymous
 Sylvain Chomet† – The Triplets of Belleville
 Richard Curtis – Love Actually
 Gareth Evans – Samurai Monogatari
 Asghar Farhadi†♦ – Dancing in the Dust
 Paul Feig†♦ – I Am David
 Todd Graff – Camp
 Catherine Hardwicke – Thirteen
 John Robert Hoffman – Good Boy!
 Paul Hunter† – Bulletproof Monk
 Andrew Jarecki – Capturing the Friedmans
 Guy Jenkin♦ – The Sleeping Dictionary
 Patty Jenkins† – Monster
 Clark Johnson♦ – S.W.A.T.
 Alex Kendrick – Flywheel
 Jonathan Liebesman† – Darkness Falls
 Li Yang – Blind Shaft
 Greg Marcks† – 11:14
 Tom McCarthy – The Station Agent
 Linda Mendoza♦ – Chasing Papi
 Glen Morgan – Willard
 Marcus Nispel† – The Texas Chainsaw Massacre
 Vadim Perelman – House of Sand and Fog
 Billy Ray – Shattered Glass
 Chris Rock – Head of State
 The Spierig Brothers† – Undead
 Wang Bing – Tie Xi Qu: West of the Tracks
 Bo Welch – The Cat in the Hat
 Tommy Wiseau – The Room
 Len Wiseman – Underworld
 Bille Woodruff† – Honey
 Rob Zombie† – House of 1000 Corpses

2004
 Sean Baker†  and Shih-Ching Tsou – Take Out
 Zach Braff† – Garden State
 Tricia Brock† – Killer Diller
 Shane Carruth – Primer
 Henry Chan♦ – Gas
 Heitor Dhalia – Nina
 Saul Dibb♦ – Bullet Boy
 Charles S. Dutton♦ – Against the Ropes
 Christopher Erskin† – Johnson Family Vacation
 Daniel Espinosa† – Babylon Disease
 Jacob Aaron Estes† – Mean Creek
 Ismaël Ferroukhi♦ – Le Grand Voyage
 Andy Fickman – Who's Your Daddy?
 Will Finn and John Sanford – Home on the Range
 Jenna Fischer – LolliLove
 Debra Granik† – Down to the Bone
 Jonathan Hensleigh – The Punisher
 Jared Hess† – Napoleon Dynamite
 Stephen Hillenburg♦† and Mark Osborne – The SpongeBob SquarePants Movie
 Tom Hooper♦ – Red Dust
 Liu Jiayin – Oxhide
 Joseph Kahn† – Torque
 Dolph Lundgren – The Defender
 Don Mancini – Seed of Chucky
 Joshua Marston – Maria Full of Grace
 Adam McKay♦ – Anchorman: The Legend of Ron Burgundy
 Pierre Morel – District B13
 Tan Chui Mui – A Tree in Tanjung Malim
 Joe Nussbaum† – Sleepover
 Chazz Palminteri – Noel
 Vincent Paronnaud – Raging Blues
 Angela Robinson† – D.E.B.S.
 Rick Schroder – Black Cloud
 Makoto Shinkai – Beyond the Clouds, the Promised Place
 Cate Shortland♦ – Somersault
 Zack Snyder† – Dawn of the Dead
 Morgan Spurlock – Super Size Me
 Jessy Terrero† – Soul Plane
 Matthew Vaughn – Layer Cake
 Conrad Vernon – Shrek 2
 James Wan† – Saw
 Masaaki Yuasa† – Mind Game
 Yaron Zilberman – Watermarks

2005
 Lexi Alexander† – Green Street
 Judd Apatow♦ – The 40-Year-Old Virgin
 Josh Appignanesi†♦ – Song of Songs
 Géla Babluani – 13 Tzameti
 Ramin Bahrani – Man Push Cart
 Corbin Bernsen – Carpool Guy
 Rémi Bezançon† – Ma vie en l'air
 Steve Bendelack – The League of Gentlemen's Apocalypse
 Shane Black – Kiss Kiss Bang Bang
 Bruce Campbell – Man with the Screaming Brain
 Jaume Collet-Serra – House of Wax
 Lee Daniels – Shadowboxer
 Polly Draper – The Naked Brothers Band: The Movie
 Cory Edwards – Hoodwinked
 Bang Eun-jin – Princess Aurora
James Franco – The Ape
 John Gatins – Dreamer
 Richard E. Grant – Wah-Wah
 Crispin Glover – What Is It?
 Jeffrey W. Byrd†♦ – King's Ransom
 Darren Grant† – Diary of a Mad Black Woman
 Vimukthi Jayasundara† – Sulanga Enu Pinisa
 Garth Jennings† – The Hitchhiker's Guide to the Galaxy
 Rian Johnson† – Brick
 Tommy Lee Jones – The Three Burials of Melquiades Estrada
 Miranda July – Me and You and Everyone We Know
 Marc Klasfeld† –  The L.A. Riot Spectacular
 Lajos Koltai – Fateless
 Francis Lawrence† – Constantine
 Mark Levin – Little Manhattan
 Claudia Llosa – Madeinusa
 Vibeke Muasya†♦ – The Take-Away Bride
 Frank Miller – Sin City
 Ellen Perry♦ – The Fall of Fujimori
 Oday Rasheed† – Underexposure
 John de Rantau♦ – Mencari Madonna
 Jason Reitman† – Thank You for Smoking
 Liev Schreiber – Everything is Illuminated
 Lee Shallat Chemel♦ – Greener Mountains
 Michael Showalter – The Baxter
 Marcos Siega† – Pretty Persuasion
 Susan Stroman – The Producers
 Tim Sullivan – 2001 Maniacs
 Jeff Wadlow† – Cry Wolf
 Joss Whedon♦ – Serenity
 Andrew Wilson and Luke Wilson – The Wendell Baker Story
 Joe Wright†♦ – Pride & Prejudice

2006
 J. J. Abrams♦ – Mission: Impossible III
 Joey Lauren Adams – Come Early Morning
 Elizabeth Allen† – Aquamarine
 Andrea Arnold† – Red Road
 Bryan Barber† – Idlewild
 Jessica Bendinger – Stick It
 David Bowers and Sam Fell – Flushed Away
 Matthew O'Callaghan† – Curious George
 Ericson Core – Invincible
 Allen Coulter♦ – Hollywoodland
 Michael Damian†♦ – Hot Tamale
 Jonathan Dayton and Valerie Faris† – Little Miss Sunshine
 Ryan Fleck† – Half Nelson
 Anne Fletcher – Step Up
 Dominique Monféry† – Franklin and the Turtle Lake Treasure
 Jason Friedberg and Aaron Seltzer – Date Movie
 Liz Friedlander† – Take the Lead
 Jeff Garlin♦ –  I Want Someone to Eat Cheese With
 Susannah Grant♦ – Catch and Release
 James Gunn♦† – Slither
 Sanaa Hamri†♦ – Something New
 Michel Hazanavicius†♦ – OSS 117: Cairo, Nest of Spies
 Florian Henckel von Donnersmarck – The Lives of Others
 Jody Hill – The Foot Fist Way
 Dallas Jenkins† – Midnight Clear
 Gil Kenan† – Monster House
 So Yong Kim – In Between Days
 Karey Kirkpatrick – Over the Hedge
 Pablo Larraín – Fuga
 Jonathan Levine† – All the Boys Love Mandy Lane
 Gorō Miyazaki – Tales from Earthsea
 Ryan Murphy – Running with Scissors
 Morgan O'Neill – Solo
 Neveldine/Taylor – Crank
 Mark Palansky† – Penelope
 Tyler Perry† – Madea's Family Reunion
 Sarah Polley† – Away from Her
 James Ponsoldt† – Off the Black
 Jason Reitman† – Thank You for Smoking
 Stevan Riley♦ – Blue Blood
 Chris Robinson† – ATL
 Joachim Rønning† and Espen Sandberg† – Bandidas
 Ari Sandel† – Wild West Comedy Show: 30 Days and 30 Nights – Hollywood to the Heartland
 Lynn Shelton† – We Go Way Back
 David Slade† – Hard Candy
 T. R. Silambarasan† – Vallavan
 Tom Vaughan†♦ – Starter for 10
 Steve "Spaz" Williams – The Wild

2007
 Ben Affleck† – Gone Baby Gone
 Stephen J. Anderson† – Meet the Robinsons
 Juan Antonio Bayona – El Orfanato
 Kevin Connolly – Gardener of Eden
 Anton Corbijn† – Control
 Gábor Csupó – Bridge to Terabithia
 Michael Dougherty† – Trick 'r Treat
 Fred Durst† – The Education of Charlie Banks
 Quentin Dupieux†♦ – Steak
 Alison Eastwood – Rails & Ties
 Charles H. Ferguson – No End in Sight
 Scott Frank – The Lookout
 Stephane Gauger – Owl and the Sparrow
 Sarah Gavron†♦ – Brick Lane
 Tony Gilroy – Michael Clayton
 Seth Gordon†♦ – The King of Kong: A Fistful of Quarters
 Mark Helfrich – Good Luck Chuck
 Helen Hunt♦ – Then She Found Me
 Angelina Jolie – A Place in Time
 Michael Katleman♦ – Primeval
 Nadine Labaki – Caramel
 Matt Maiellaro and Dave Willis – Aqua Teen Hunger Force Colon Movie Film for Theaters
 Mary Stuart Masterson♦ – The Cake Eaters
 Chris Miller and Raman Hui – Shrek the Third
 Patricia Riggen† – Under the Same Moon
 Marjane Satrapi – Persepolis
 Jeremy Saulnier† – Murder Party
 Fred Savage♦ – Daddy Day Camp
 Akiva Schaffer†♦ – Hot Rod
 Rob Schneider – Big Stan
 David Schwimmer♦ – Run Fatboy Run
 Cai Shangjun – The Red Awn
 David Silverman†♦ — The Simpsons Movie
 Simon J. Smith – Bee Movie
 Colin Strause and Greg Strause† – Aliens vs. Predator: Requiem
 Justin Theroux – Dedication
 Jim Threapleton – Extraordinary Rendition
 Stuart Townsend – Battle in Seattle
 David Wall – Noëlle
 Taika Waititi† – Eagle vs Shark
 Adam Wingard† – Home Sick

2008
 Marc Abraham – Flash of Genius
 Guillermo Arriaga† – The Burning Plain
 Daniel Barnz† – Phoebe in Wonderland
 Anna Boden† – Sugar
 Eric Brevig – Journey to the Center of the Earth
 Fred Cavayé† – Anything for Her
 Jon M. Chu† – Step Up 2: The Streets
 Noel Clarke – Adulthood
 Kirk DeMicco – Space Chimps
 Elissa Down† – The Black Balloon
 Jimmy Hayward and Steve Martino – Horton Hears a Who!
 Diane English – The Women
 Sacha Gervasi – Anvil! The Story of Anvil
 David Hackl – Saw V
 Na Hong-jin – The Chaser
 Joanna Hogg♦ – Unrelated
 Byron Howard and Chris Williams† – Bolt
 Jon Hurwitz and Hayden Schlossberg – Harold & Kumar Escape from Guantanamo Bay
 Barry Jenkins† – Medicine for Melancholy
 Charlie Kaufman – Synecdoche, New York
 Michael Patrick King♦ – Sex and the City
 Madonna – Filth and Wisdom
 Michael McCullers† – Baby Mama
 Martin McDonagh† – In Bruges
 Steve McQueen† – Hunger
 David Oliveras – Watercolors
 Nina Paley –  Sita Sings the Blues
 Marianna Palka – Good Dick
 Lori Petty† – The Poker House
 Johan Renck† – Downloading Nancy
 Alex Rivera† – Sleep Dealer 
 Josh Safdie† – The Pleasure of Being Robbed
 Steven Sebring – Patti Smith: Dream of Life
 John Stevenson – Kung Fu Panda
 Tate Taylor† – Pretty Ugly People
 James Watkins – Eden Lake
 Sean Weathers – House of the Damned
 George C. Wolfe♦ – Nights in Rodanthe
 Rupert Wyatt† – The Escapist
 Kent Alterman - Semi-Pro

2009
 Shane Acker† – 9
 Drew Barrymore♦ – Whip It
 Peter Billingsley† – Couples Retreat
 Neill Blomkamp† – District 9
 Benny Boom† – Next Day Air
 Damien Chazelle – Guy and Madeline on a Park Bench
 Scott Cooper – Crazy Heart
 Zach Cregger and Trevor Moore – Miss March
 Matthew Crouch – The Cross
 Juan Delancer – Trópico de Sangre
 James DeMonaco – Staten Island
 Xavier Dolan – I Killed My Mother
 Adam Elliot† – Mary and Max
 Shana Feste† – The Greatest
 Glenn Ficarra and John Requa – I Love You Phillip Morris
 David Field – The Combination
 Ruben Fleischer†♦ – Zombieland
 Tom Ford – A Single Man
 Thor Freudenthal† – Hotel for Dogs
 Cary Joji Fukunaga† – Sin Nombre
 Ricky Gervais♦ – The Invention of Lying
 Will Gluck – Fired Up!
 Kevin Greutert – Saw VI
 Manish Gupta – The Stoneman Murders
 Andrew Haigh♦ – Greek Pete
 Melora Hardin – You
 Cheryl Hines – Serious Moonlight
 Nathan Hope† – Elsewhere
 Armando Iannucci♦ – In the Loop
 Michael Imperioli† – The Hungry Ghosts
 Craig Johnson – True Adolescents
 Duncan Jones† – Moon
 Adam Kane†♦ – Formosa Betrayed
 James Kerwin† – Yesterday Was a Lie
 Paul King♦ – Bunny and the Bull
 Takeshi Koike♦ – Redline
 Kishore Kumar – Konchem Ishtam Konchem Kashtam
 Phil Lord and Chris Miller♦ – Cloudy with a Chance of Meatballs
 David Lowery† – St. Nick
 Samuel Maoz – Lebanon
 Jodie Markell – The Loss of a Teardrop Diamond
 Oren Moverman – The Messenger
 Shirin Neshat† – Women Without Men
 Bob Peterson – Up
 James Ricardo – Opie Gets Laid
 Aaron Schneider – Get Low
 Steve Shill♦ – Obsessed
 Peter Strickland – Katalin Varga
 Suseenthiran – Vennila Kabadi Kuzhu
 Sooni Taraporevala – Little Zizou
 Sam Taylor-Wood† – Nowhere Boy
 Mike Thurmeier† – Ice Age: Dawn of the Dinosaurs
 Mark Tonderai – Hush
 Phil Traill†♦ – All About Steve
 Nia Vardalos – I Hate Valentine's Day
 Malcolm Venville†♦ – 44 Inch Chest
 Damien Dante Wayans♦ – Dance Flick
 Marc Webb† – 500 Days of Summer
 Jiang Wenli – Lan
 Suzi Yoonessi – Dear Lemon Lima
 Hoyt Yeatman – G-Force

2010s

2010
 Casey Affleck† – I'm Still Here
 Mo Ali – Shank
 Tim Allen♦ – Crazy on the Outside
 Richard Ayoade† – Submarine
 Banksy – Exit Through the Gift Shop
 Samuel Bayer† – A Nightmare on Elm Street
 Jim Cummings†  – No Floodwall Here
 Pierre Coffin♦† and Chris Renaud†  – Despicable Me
 Brendon Culliton – If I Should Fall
 Vincent D'Onofrio† – Don't Go in the Woods
 Gareth Edwards♦† – Monsters
 Nathan Greno – Tangled
 Tom Harper♦† – The Scouting Book for Boys
 Tanya Hamilton† – Night Catches Us
 Philip Seymour Hoffman – Jack Goes Boating
 Rowan Joffé♦ – Brighton Rock
 Henry Joost and Ariel Schulman† – Catfish
 Larysa Kondracki – The Whistleblower
 Joseph Kosinski – Tron: Legacy
 William Monahan – London Boulevard
 David Michôd† –  Animal Kingdom
 Ben Miller – Huge
 Chris Morris – Four Lions
 Daisuke Namikawa – Wonderful World
 Troy Nixey† – Don't Be Afraid of the Dark
 Leland Orser – Morning
 Brad Peyton† – Cats & Dogs: The Revenge of Kitty Galore
 Josh Radnor – happythankyoumoreplease
 Julie Anne Robinson♦ – The Last Song
 Jim Field Smith† – She's Out of My League
 Joann Sfar – Gainsbourg: A Heroic Life
 Floria Sigismondi† – The Runaways
 Scott Stewart† – Legion
 Massy Tadjedin – Last Night
 Leehom Wang –  Love in Disguise
 Hiromasa Yonebayashi – The Secret World of Arrietty
 Tom Six – The Human Centipede (First Sequence)
 Erik White† – Lottery Ticket
 Max Winkler† – Ceremony

2011
 Salim Akil♦ – Jumping the Broom
 Katie Aselton – The Freebie
 James Bobin♦† – The Muppets
 Mike Cahill – Another Earth
 Cedric the Entertainer – Dance Fu
 J. C. Chandor – Margin Call
 Paddy Considine† – Tyrannosaur
 Joe Cornish♦† – Attack the Block
 Alexandre Courtes – The Incident
 Simon Curtis♦ – My Week with Marilyn
 Sean Durkin† – Martha Marcy May Marlene
 Vera Farmiga – Higher Ground
 Mike Flanagan – Absentia
 Dexter Fletcher – Wild Bill
 Evan Glodell – Bellflower
 Famke Janssen – Bringing Up Bobby
 Giddens Ko – You Are the Apple of My Eye
 Justin Kurzel – The Snowtown Murders
 Julia Leigh – Sleeping Beauty
 Yonah Lewis and Calvin Thomas – Amy George
 Niall MacCormick♦ – Albatross
 Victoria Mahoney† – Yelling to the Sky
 Artie Mandelberg♦ – Inside Out
 John Michael McDonagh – The Guard
 Dermot Mulroney – Love, Wedding, Marriage
 Nick Murphy♦ – The Awakening
 George Nolfi – The Adjustment Bureau
 Ben Palmer♦† – The Inbetweeners Movie
 Alex Ross Perry† – The Color Wheel
 Michael Rapaport♦ – Beats, Rhymes & Life: The Travels of A Tribe Called Quest
 Dee Rees† – Pariah
 Keith Scholey – African Cats
 Sarah Smith - Arthur Christmas
 Taylor Sheridan† –Vile
 Jason Winer♦† – Arthur
 Jennifer Yuh Nelson – Kung Fu Panda 2

2012
 Rodney Ascher♦† – Room 237
 Paolo Benetazzo† – Study
 Ciaran Foy – Citadel
 Drew Goddard – The Cabin in the Woods
 Anthony Hemingway♦ – Red Tails
 Don Hertzfeldt – It's Such a Beautiful Day
 Dustin Hoffman – Quartet
 Peggy Holmes – Secret of the Wings
 Nicholas Jarecki – Arbitrage
 Brian Klugman – The Words
 Robert Lorenz – Trouble with the Curve
 Seth MacFarlane♦† – Ted
 Daigo Matsui – Afro Tanaka
 Jason Moore♦ – Pitch Perfect
 Usher Morgan† – The Thought Exchange 
 Jared Moshe – Dead Man's Burden
 Alonso Mayo† – The Story of Luke
 Rich Moore♦ – Wreck-It Ralph
 Mamoru Nagano – Gothicmade
 Nima Nourizadeh† – Project X
 Gabe Polsky – The Motel Life
 Kazik Radwanski – Tower
 Peter Ramsey – Rise of the Guardians
 Benjamin Renner – Ernest & Celestine
 RZA† – The Man with the Iron Fists
 Rupert Sanders† – Snow White and the Huntsman
 Lorene Scafaria – Seeking a Friend for the End of the World
 Josh Schwartz – Fun Size
 Scott Speer† – Step Up Revolution
 Genndy Tartakovsky♦ – Hotel Transylvania
 Josh Trank♦ – Chronicle
 Michael Whitton – Exit Strategy
 Xu Zheng – Lost in Thailand
 Benh Zeitlin† – Beasts of the Southern Wild

2013
 Fede Álvarez† – Evil Dead
 Lake Bell† – In a World...
 Stuart Blumberg – Thanks for Sharing
 Lawrie Brewster† – Lord of Tears
 Cal Brunker - Escape from Planet Earth
 Maggie Carey† – The To Do List
 Diablo Cody – Paradise
 Nat Faxon and Jim Rash – The Way, Way Back
 Naomi Foner – Very Good Girls
 Liz W. Garcia – The Lifeguard
 Simple Gogoi – Tumi Jodi Kuwa
 Evan Goldberg and Seth Rogen – This Is the End
 Joseph Gordon-Levitt† – Don Jon
 Dave Grohl† – Sound City
 Ryan Coogler† – Fruitvale Station
 Ha Jung-woo – Fasten Your Seatbelt
 Jerusha Hess – Austenland
 Eliza Hittman† – It Felt Like Love
 Bilal Lashari – Waar
 Michelle Latimer† – Alias
 Jennifer Lee – Frozen
 Sergio Monsalve – Jacinto Convit
 Andy Muschietti† – Mama
 Keanu Reeves – Man of Tai Chi
 Dan Scanlon – Monsters University
 Jill Soloway – Afternoon Delight
 David Soren♦† – Turbo
 Michael Tiddes† – A Haunted House
 Jocelyn Towne – I Am I
 Zhao Wei† – So Young

2014
 Ana Lily Amirpour – A Girl Walks Home Alone at Night
 Adil El Arbi and Bilall Fallah†♦ – Image
 Wes Ball† – The Maze Runner
 Jason Bateman♦ – Bad Words
 Paul Bettany – Shelter
 James Ward Byrkit – Coherence
 Chen Sicheng – Beijing Love Story
 Nick Cheung – Ghost Rituals
 Shawn Christensen – Before I Disappear
 David Cross♦ – Hits
 Russell Crowe  – The Water Diviner
 Chris Evans – Before We Go
 Susanna Fogel♦ – Life Partners
 Hitori Gekidan – A Bolt from the Blue
 Dan Gilroy – Nightcrawler
 Akiva Goldsman♦ – Winter's Tale
 Ryan Gosling  – Lost River
 Dave Green†♦ – Earth to Echo
 Jorge R. Gutierrez† – The Book of Life
 Andy Hamilton♦ – What We Did on Our Holiday
 Han Han – Duckweed
 Simon Helberg – We'll Never Have Paris
 July Jung – A Girl at My Door
 Chad Stahelski – John Wick
 Riley Stearns† – Faults
 Jennifer Kent† – The Babadook
 Peter Lepeniotis - The Nut Job
 William H. Macy♦ – Rudderless
 Adam MacDonald –Backcountry
 Charlie McDowell – The One I Love
 Chris Messina – Alex of Venice
 Wally Pfister – Transcendence
 Nabeel Qureshi♦ – Na Maloom Afraad
 Mark Raso† – Copenhagen
 James Rolfe† – "Angry Video Game Nerd: The Movie"
 Tristram Shapeero♦† – Merry Friggin' Christmas
 Gary Shore† – Dracula Untold
 Justin Simien† – Dear White People
 Jon Stewart – Rosewater
 Robert Stromberg – Maleficent
 Rob Thomas♦ – Veronica Mars
 Kazuo Umezu – Mother
 Jon Watts† – Clown
 Gren Wells – The Road Within
 Michael Williams – Ozland

2015
 Natalie Portman† – A Tale of Love and Darkness
 Aleksander Bach – Hitman: Agent 47
 Elizabeth Banks† – Pitch Perfect 2
 Jawad Bashir – Maya
 Natalie Bible' – Windsor Drive
 Stephen Campanelli – Momentum
 Don Cheadle♦ – Miles Ahead
 Marya Cohn† – The Girl in the Book
 Director X†♦ – Across the Line
 Stephen Dunn† – Closet Monster
 Momina Duraid♦ – Bin Roye
 Joel Edgerton† – The Gift
 Robert Eggers♦† – The Witch
 Ray Gallardo† – Callejero
 Alex Garland – Ex Machina
 Jonathan Goldstein† and John Francis Daley† – Vacation
 Anna Rose Holmer† – The Fits
 Marielle Heller – The Diary of a Teenage Girl
 Dean Israelite†♦ – Project Almanac
 Vahid Jalilvand – Wednesday, May 9
 Yasir Jaswal – Jalaibee
 Kahlil Joseph† – The Reflektor Tapes
 Ariel Kleiman† – Partisan
 Luo Luo – The Last Women Standing
 John Maclean† – Slow West
 Andrew Mogel and Jarrad Paul – The D Train
 Reed Morano – Meadowland
 Ilya Naishuller† – Hardcore Henry
 László Nemes – Son of Saul
 J. G. Quintel♦† – Regular Show: The Movie
 R. Ravikumar – Indru Netru Naalai
 Gary Rydstrom† –  Strange Magic
 Amit Sharma – Tevar
 Trey Edward Shults† – Krisha
 Peter Sohn – The Good Dinosaur
 Austin Stark† – The Runner
 Alec Su – The Left Ear
 Paul Tibbitt♦ – The SpongeBob Movie: Sponge Out of Water
 James Vanderbilt – Truth
 Ally Walker† – Sex, Death and Bowling
 S. Craig Zahler – Bone Tomahawk
 Chloé Zhao† – Songs My Brothers Taught Me

2016
 Wang Baoqiang – Buddies in India
 Alessandro Carloni – Kung Fu Panda 3
 Robert Carlyle♦ – The Legend of Barney Thomson
 Eleanor Coppola† – Paris Can Wait
 Kelly Fremon Craig† – The Edge of Seventeen
 Garth Davis† – Lion
 Drew Fortier† – Attack of Life: The Bang Tango Movie
 Katie Holmes – All We Had
 Michelle Johnston – A Cinderella Story: If the Shoe Fits
 Clay Kaytis and Fergal Reilly – The Angry Birds Movie
 Travis Knight – Kubo and the Two Strings
 Gee Malik Linton† – Exposed
 Avid Liongoren† – Saving Sally
 Alice Lowe† – Prevenge
 Ashley McKenzie† – Werewolf
 Tim Miller – Deadpool
 Bob Nelson – The Confirmation
 Cedric Nicolas-Troyan† – The Huntsman: Winter's War
 Tony Olmos† – South of 8
 Asim Raza♦ – Ho Mann Jahaan
 Matthew Ross† – Frank & Lola
 David F. Sandberg♦† – Lights Out
 Luke Scott♦† – Morgan
 Jamal Shah – Revenge of the Worthless
 Veena Sud♦† – The Salton Sea
 Doug Sweetland† – Storks
 Amber Tamblyn – Paint It Black
 Richard Tanne – Southside with You
 Greg Tiernan♦† – Sausage Party
 Dan Trachtenberg♦† – 10 Cloverfield Lane

2017
 Ana Asensio – Most Beautiful Island
 Jay Baruchel – Goon: Last of the Enforcers
 Charlie Bean and Paul Fisher & Bob Logan – The Lego Ninjago Movie
 Antoine Bourges† – Fail to Appear
 Dean Devlin♦ – Geostorm
 Denise Di Novi♦ – Unforgettable
 Brian Fee – Cars 3
 Cory Finley – Thoroughbreds
 Anna Foerster – Underworld: Blood Wars
 Greta Gerwig† – Lady Bird
 Michael Gracey – The Greatest Showman
 Jason Hall – Thank You for Your Service
 Kathleen Hepburn – Never Steady, Never Still
 Taran Killam – Killing Gunther
 Brie Larson† – Unicorn Store
 David Leitch#† – Atomic Blonde
 Taron Lexton† – In Search of Fellini
 Dave McCary♦† – Brigsby Bear
 Chris McKay – The Lego Batman Movie
 Hallie Meyers-Shyer – Home Again
 Adrian Molina – Coco 
 Usama Mukwaya – Love Faces
 Anthony Onah – The Price
 Jordan Peele – Get Out
 Timothy Reckart – The Star
 Terry Ross† – Carving a Life
 Andy Serkis – Breathe
 Quinn Shephard† – Blame
 Aaron Sorkin – Molly's Game
 Eric Stoltz♦† – Class Rank
 Jessica M. Thompson – The Light of the Moon
 Lea Thompson♦ – The Year of Spectacular Men

2018
 Ari Aster† – Hereditary
 Johan Bodell† – The Cabin
 Bo Burnham† – Eighth Grade
 Aneesh Chaganty† – Searching
 Kay Cannon – Blockers
 Bradley Cooper – A Star Is Born
 Paul Dano – Wildlife
 Steven S. DeKnight♦ – Pacific Rim Uprising
 Carlos López Estrada – Blindspotting
 Daniel Florenzano† – The Evil Rises
 Nicolai Fuglsig – 12 Strong
 Karen Gillan† – The Party's Just Beginning
 Heather Graham –  Half Magic
 Christian Gudegast – Den of Thieves
 Jonah Hill† – Mid90s
 Aaron Horvath – Teen Titans Go! to the Movies
 Arunraja Kamaraj – Kanaa
 Anthony Mandler† – Monster
 Scott Mosier – The Grinch
 Mari Okada† – Maquia: When the Promised Flower Blooms
 Alex Pettyfer† – Back Roads
 Boots Riley† – Sorry to Bother You
 Christian Rivers – Mortal Engines
 Jared Stern†♦ – Happy Anniversary
 Jayson Thiessen♦ - My Little Pony; The Movie
 Jeff Tomsic†♦ – Tag
 Jonathan Watson –  Arizona

2019
 Annabelle Attanasio – Mickey and the Bear
 Andrea Berloff – The Kitchen
 Robin Bissell – The Best of Enemies
 Nick Bruno and Troy Quane – Spies in Disguise
 Matthew Michael Carnahan - Mosul
 Michael Chaves♦† – The Curse of La Llorona
 Monia Chokri – A Brother's Love
 Josh Cooley† – Toy Story 4
 Michael Angelo Covino† – The Climb
 Gary Dauberman – Annabelle Comes Home
 Roxann Dawson♦ – Breakthrough
 Mati Diop – Atlantics
 Lino DiSalvo – Playmobil: The Movie
 Nora Fingscheidt – System Crasher
 Micah Gallo† – Itsy Bitsy
 Mike Gan†♦ – Burn
 Ravin Gandhi – 100 Days to Live
 Rachel Griffiths†♦ – Ride Like a Girl 
 Bryce Dallas Howard†♦ – Dads
 Simon Kinberg – Dark Phoenix
 Sarah Lancaster – Josie & Jack
 Van Ling – Cliffs of Freedom
 Ladj Ly† –  Les Misérables
 Gail Mancuso♦ – A Dog's Journey 
 Melina Matsoukas†♦ – Queen & Slim
 William McGregor♦† – Gwen
 Carlo Mirabella Davis – Swallow
 Adam Egypt Mortimer♦† – Daniel Isn't Real
 Wagner Moura – Marighella
 Shannon Murphy – Babyteeth
 Tyler Nilson† and Michael Schwartz† – The Peanut Butter Falcon
 Katharine O'Brien† – Lost Transmissions
 Sergio Pablos  – Klaus
 Andrew Patterson† – The Vast of Night
 Joe Penna♦† – Arctic
 Annie Silverstein – Bull
 Grant Sputore† – I Am Mother
 Gene Stupnitsky† – Good Boys
 Joe Talbot† - The Last Black Man in San Francisco
 Emma Tammi – The Wind
 Michael Tyburski† – The Sound of Silence
 Viktor van der Valk – Nocturne
 Olivia Wilde† – Booksmart
 Phillip Youmans – Burning Cane

2020s

2020
 Max Barbakow – Palm Springs
 Halle Berry – Bruised
 Harry Bradbeer♦ – Enola Holmes
 Gerard Bush and Christopher Renz† – Antebellum
 Brian Patrick Butler† – Friend of the World
 Eric D. Cabello Diaz – El Camino de Xico
 Dean Craig† – Love Wedding Repeat
 Joel Crawford† – The Croods: A New Age
 Jack Danini† – Ode to Passion
 Emerald Fennell† – Promising Young Woman
 Michael Fimognari† – To All the Boys: P.S. I Still Love You
 Will Forbes – John Henry
 Jeff Fowler† – Sonic the Hedgehog
 Edward Hall♦† – Blithe Spirit
 Sam Hargrave† – Extraction
 Chris Henchy† – Impractical Jokers: The Movie
 David Henrie† – This Is the Year
 Natalie Erika James† – Relic
 Anthony Jerjen† – Inherit the Viper
 Aneil Karia♦† – Surge
 Glen Keane and John Kahrs – Over the Moon
 Regina King♦† – One Night in Miami...
 Natalie Krinsky – The Broken Hearts Gallery
 Patrice Laliberté♦† – The Decline
 Andrew Lawrence – The Office Mix-Up
 Anthony Leone† – Hacksaw
 Rob Lodermeier – The Willoughbys
 Viggo Mortensen – Falling
 Jekaterina Oertel – DAU. Natasha
 Prentice Penny♦† – Uncorcked
 David Prior† – The Empty Man
 Emma Seligman† – Shiva Baby
 Remi Weekes♦ – His House
 Autumn de Wilde† – Emma
 David S. F. Wilson† – Bloodshot
 Florian Zeller♦ – The Father

2021
 Justine Bateman† – Violet
 Ryan Bliss† – Alice Fades Away
 Mika Boorem† – Hollywood.Con
 Jonathan Butterell – Everybody's Talking About Jamie
 Enrico Casarosa – Luca
 Ryan Crego♦ – Arlo the Alligator Boy
 Bakhtyar Fatah♦ – 09
 Jonah Feingold† – Dating and New York
 Dean Fleischer-Camp† – Marcel the Shell with Shoes On
 Hamish Grieve† – Rumble
 Maggie Gyllenhaal♦ – The Lost Daughter
 Rebecca Hall – Passing
 Lisa Joy♦ – Reminiscence
 Fran Kranz  – Mass
 Simon McQuoid – Mortal Kombat
 Brian Andrew Mendoza† – Sweet Girl
 Marcos Mereles† – All Is Vanity
 Lin-Manuel Miranda – tick, tick... BOOM!
 Dasha Nekrasova – The Scary of Sixty-First
 Edson Oda – Nine Days
 Megan Park† – The Fallout
 Questlove† – Summer of Soul
 Diana Ringo – Quarantine
 Alessandra de Rossi – My Amanda
 Rodo Sayagues – Don't Breathe 2
 Evan Spiliotopoulos – The Unholy
 Liesl Tommy♦ – Respect
 Mattson Tomlin – Mother/Android
 Jude Weng – Finding 'Ohana
 Robin Wright†♦ – Land
 Carlson Young† –  The Blazing World

2022
 Kyle Edward Ball† – Skinamarink
 Mayim Bialik† – As They Made Us
 Loren Bouchard♦ and Bernard Derriman†♦ – The Bob's Burgers Movie
 Berkley Brady†♦ – Dark Nature
 Reid Carolin and Channing Tatum – Dog
 Janeen Damian – Falling for Christmas
 John C. Donkin – The Ice Age Adventures of Buck Wild
 Jesse Eisenberg† – When You Finish Saving the World
 Tim Federle♦ – Better Nate Than Ever
 Tom George♦ – See How They Run
 Michael Giacchino♦ –  Werewolf by Night
 Mark Gustafson – Pinocchio
 Alex Hardcastle♦ – Senior Year
 Lee Jung-jae – Hunt
 Sanaa Lathan† – On the Come Up
 Charlotte Le Bon† – Falcon Lake
 Gail Lerner†♦ – Cheaper by the Dozen
 Jennifer N. Linch† – Kung Fu Ghost
 Pierre Perifel – The Bad Guys
 J. J. Perry – Day Shift
 Daniel and Michael Philippou† – Talk to Me
 Kyra Sedgwick♦ – Space Oddity
 Domee Shi† – Turning Red
 Goran Stolevski† – You Won't Be Alone
 Ian Tripp† and Ryan Schafer† – Everybody Dies by the End
 Charlotte Wells – Aftersun

2023
 Kenya Barris♦ – You People
 Charlie Day – Fool's Paradise
 Nicholas Maggio† – American Metal
 Michael B. Jordan – Creed III
 Chris Stuckmann† – Shelby Oaks
 Patrick Wilson – Insidious: Fear the Dark

2024
 S. J. Clarkson♦ – Madame Web

Unknown
 Anna Kendrick – The Dating Game
 Jonathan Krisel – Untitled Sesame Street film
 Minkyu Lee† – The Witch Boy
 Kelly Marcel – Venom 3
 Chris Pine – Poolman
 Taylor Swift† – TBA
 Zelda Williams† – Lisa Frankenstein
 Finn Wolfhard and Billy Bryk – Hell of a Summer
 Rachel Morrison - Flint Strong''

See also
 List of cinematic firsts

Notes

References

 
Debut